

585001–585100 

|-bgcolor=#E9E9E9
| 585001 ||  || — || October 20, 2008 || Kitt Peak || Spacewatch ||  || align=right | 1.9 km || 
|-id=002 bgcolor=#E9E9E9
| 585002 ||  || — || November 8, 2013 || Kitt Peak || Spacewatch ||  || align=right | 1.8 km || 
|-id=003 bgcolor=#E9E9E9
| 585003 ||  || — || February 14, 2010 || Kitt Peak || Spacewatch ||  || align=right | 1.9 km || 
|-id=004 bgcolor=#E9E9E9
| 585004 ||  || — || October 7, 2008 || Mount Lemmon || Mount Lemmon Survey ||  || align=right | 2.2 km || 
|-id=005 bgcolor=#E9E9E9
| 585005 ||  || — || October 1, 2008 || Kitt Peak || Spacewatch ||  || align=right | 1.7 km || 
|-id=006 bgcolor=#fefefe
| 585006 ||  || — || March 31, 2008 || Mount Lemmon || Mount Lemmon Survey ||  || align=right data-sort-value="0.69" | 690 m || 
|-id=007 bgcolor=#fefefe
| 585007 ||  || — || November 26, 2014 || Haleakala || Pan-STARRS ||  || align=right data-sort-value="0.66" | 660 m || 
|-id=008 bgcolor=#E9E9E9
| 585008 ||  || — || February 21, 2002 || Kitt Peak || Spacewatch ||  || align=right | 1.1 km || 
|-id=009 bgcolor=#fefefe
| 585009 ||  || — || March 16, 2012 || Mount Lemmon || Mount Lemmon Survey ||  || align=right data-sort-value="0.68" | 680 m || 
|-id=010 bgcolor=#E9E9E9
| 585010 ||  || — || March 6, 2011 || Kitt Peak || Spacewatch ||  || align=right data-sort-value="0.93" | 930 m || 
|-id=011 bgcolor=#d6d6d6
| 585011 ||  || — || November 17, 1995 || Kitt Peak || Spacewatch ||  || align=right | 2.6 km || 
|-id=012 bgcolor=#E9E9E9
| 585012 ||  || — || September 6, 2004 || Siding Spring || SSS ||  || align=right | 1.2 km || 
|-id=013 bgcolor=#E9E9E9
| 585013 ||  || — || December 19, 2009 || Mount Lemmon || Mount Lemmon Survey ||  || align=right | 1.3 km || 
|-id=014 bgcolor=#d6d6d6
| 585014 ||  || — || September 24, 2011 || Mount Lemmon || Mount Lemmon Survey ||  || align=right | 2.4 km || 
|-id=015 bgcolor=#fefefe
| 585015 ||  || — || March 12, 2008 || Kitt Peak || Spacewatch ||  || align=right data-sort-value="0.70" | 700 m || 
|-id=016 bgcolor=#E9E9E9
| 585016 ||  || — || October 10, 2004 || Kitt Peak || Spacewatch ||  || align=right | 1.3 km || 
|-id=017 bgcolor=#E9E9E9
| 585017 ||  || — || January 25, 2006 || Kitt Peak || Spacewatch ||  || align=right data-sort-value="0.98" | 980 m || 
|-id=018 bgcolor=#E9E9E9
| 585018 ||  || — || October 24, 2013 || Mount Lemmon || Mount Lemmon Survey ||  || align=right | 1.2 km || 
|-id=019 bgcolor=#fefefe
| 585019 ||  || — || June 18, 2013 || Haleakala || Pan-STARRS ||  || align=right data-sort-value="0.60" | 600 m || 
|-id=020 bgcolor=#E9E9E9
| 585020 ||  || — || November 29, 2013 || Nogales || M. Schwartz, P. R. Holvorcem ||  || align=right | 1.00 km || 
|-id=021 bgcolor=#d6d6d6
| 585021 ||  || — || August 27, 2006 || Kitt Peak || Spacewatch ||  || align=right | 2.7 km || 
|-id=022 bgcolor=#E9E9E9
| 585022 ||  || — || January 25, 2015 || Haleakala || Pan-STARRS ||  || align=right | 2.0 km || 
|-id=023 bgcolor=#E9E9E9
| 585023 ||  || — || November 12, 2013 || Kitt Peak || Spacewatch ||  || align=right | 2.0 km || 
|-id=024 bgcolor=#E9E9E9
| 585024 ||  || — || August 31, 2017 || Haleakala || Pan-STARRS ||  || align=right | 1.8 km || 
|-id=025 bgcolor=#E9E9E9
| 585025 ||  || — || November 3, 2013 || Haleakala || Pan-STARRS ||  || align=right | 1.4 km || 
|-id=026 bgcolor=#d6d6d6
| 585026 ||  || — || September 13, 2007 || Mount Lemmon || Mount Lemmon Survey ||  || align=right | 2.2 km || 
|-id=027 bgcolor=#E9E9E9
| 585027 ||  || — || November 1, 1999 || Kitt Peak || Spacewatch ||  || align=right | 1.5 km || 
|-id=028 bgcolor=#d6d6d6
| 585028 ||  || — || May 23, 2006 || Mount Lemmon || Mount Lemmon Survey ||  || align=right | 1.8 km || 
|-id=029 bgcolor=#E9E9E9
| 585029 ||  || — || February 27, 2006 || Kitt Peak || Spacewatch ||  || align=right | 2.0 km || 
|-id=030 bgcolor=#E9E9E9
| 585030 ||  || — || March 31, 2008 || Kitt Peak || Spacewatch ||  || align=right data-sort-value="0.89" | 890 m || 
|-id=031 bgcolor=#E9E9E9
| 585031 ||  || — || September 29, 2009 || Mount Lemmon || Mount Lemmon Survey ||  || align=right | 1.1 km || 
|-id=032 bgcolor=#d6d6d6
| 585032 ||  || — || March 22, 2015 || Haleakala || Pan-STARRS ||  || align=right | 2.2 km || 
|-id=033 bgcolor=#E9E9E9
| 585033 ||  || — || September 17, 2013 || Mount Lemmon || Mount Lemmon Survey ||  || align=right | 1.0 km || 
|-id=034 bgcolor=#E9E9E9
| 585034 ||  || — || October 25, 2013 || Mount Lemmon || Mount Lemmon Survey ||  || align=right | 1.3 km || 
|-id=035 bgcolor=#E9E9E9
| 585035 ||  || — || October 2, 2003 || Kitt Peak || Spacewatch ||  || align=right | 1.6 km || 
|-id=036 bgcolor=#fefefe
| 585036 ||  || — || August 13, 2013 || Kitt Peak || Spacewatch ||  || align=right data-sort-value="0.80" | 800 m || 
|-id=037 bgcolor=#E9E9E9
| 585037 ||  || — || January 16, 2005 || Kitt Peak || Spacewatch ||  || align=right | 1.8 km || 
|-id=038 bgcolor=#fefefe
| 585038 ||  || — || July 27, 2009 || Kitt Peak || Spacewatch ||  || align=right data-sort-value="0.86" | 860 m || 
|-id=039 bgcolor=#d6d6d6
| 585039 ||  || — || October 21, 2012 || Haleakala || Pan-STARRS ||  || align=right | 2.2 km || 
|-id=040 bgcolor=#E9E9E9
| 585040 ||  || — || January 6, 2010 || Mount Lemmon || Mount Lemmon Survey ||  || align=right | 2.0 km || 
|-id=041 bgcolor=#E9E9E9
| 585041 ||  || — || March 23, 2015 || Haleakala || Pan-STARRS ||  || align=right | 2.1 km || 
|-id=042 bgcolor=#E9E9E9
| 585042 ||  || — || February 2, 2006 || Mount Lemmon || Mount Lemmon Survey ||  || align=right | 1.4 km || 
|-id=043 bgcolor=#E9E9E9
| 585043 ||  || — || August 14, 2012 || Haleakala || Pan-STARRS ||  || align=right | 2.1 km || 
|-id=044 bgcolor=#E9E9E9
| 585044 ||  || — || October 2, 2013 || Kitt Peak || Spacewatch ||  || align=right data-sort-value="0.87" | 870 m || 
|-id=045 bgcolor=#E9E9E9
| 585045 ||  || — || July 29, 2008 || Mount Lemmon || Mount Lemmon Survey ||  || align=right | 1.5 km || 
|-id=046 bgcolor=#d6d6d6
| 585046 ||  || — || October 18, 2007 || Mount Lemmon || Mount Lemmon Survey ||  || align=right | 2.3 km || 
|-id=047 bgcolor=#E9E9E9
| 585047 ||  || — || March 24, 2003 || Kitt Peak || Spacewatch ||  || align=right | 1.7 km || 
|-id=048 bgcolor=#d6d6d6
| 585048 ||  || — || April 3, 2016 || Haleakala || Pan-STARRS ||  || align=right | 2.3 km || 
|-id=049 bgcolor=#E9E9E9
| 585049 ||  || — || September 16, 2004 || Anderson Mesa || LONEOS ||  || align=right data-sort-value="0.99" | 990 m || 
|-id=050 bgcolor=#E9E9E9
| 585050 ||  || — || August 26, 2003 || Crni Vrh || H. Mikuž ||  || align=right | 2.4 km || 
|-id=051 bgcolor=#E9E9E9
| 585051 ||  || — || March 23, 2003 || Palomar || NEAT ||  || align=right | 1.9 km || 
|-id=052 bgcolor=#E9E9E9
| 585052 ||  || — || November 10, 2009 || Mount Lemmon || Mount Lemmon Survey ||  || align=right data-sort-value="0.99" | 990 m || 
|-id=053 bgcolor=#d6d6d6
| 585053 ||  || — || August 25, 2012 || Kitt Peak || Spacewatch ||  || align=right | 3.4 km || 
|-id=054 bgcolor=#E9E9E9
| 585054 ||  || — || September 10, 2004 || Kitt Peak || Spacewatch ||  || align=right | 1.6 km || 
|-id=055 bgcolor=#d6d6d6
| 585055 ||  || — || October 11, 2012 || Haleakala || Pan-STARRS ||  || align=right | 2.9 km || 
|-id=056 bgcolor=#d6d6d6
| 585056 ||  || — || May 25, 2006 || Kitt Peak || Spacewatch ||  || align=right | 2.2 km || 
|-id=057 bgcolor=#E9E9E9
| 585057 ||  || — || April 3, 2011 || Haleakala || Pan-STARRS ||  || align=right | 1.7 km || 
|-id=058 bgcolor=#E9E9E9
| 585058 ||  || — || April 4, 2003 || Kitt Peak || Spacewatch ||  || align=right | 1.1 km || 
|-id=059 bgcolor=#E9E9E9
| 585059 ||  || — || June 10, 2007 || Kitt Peak || Spacewatch ||  || align=right | 1.7 km || 
|-id=060 bgcolor=#d6d6d6
| 585060 ||  || — || November 11, 2001 || Apache Point || SDSS Collaboration ||  || align=right | 3.7 km || 
|-id=061 bgcolor=#fefefe
| 585061 ||  || — || January 28, 2015 || Haleakala || Pan-STARRS ||  || align=right data-sort-value="0.65" | 650 m || 
|-id=062 bgcolor=#E9E9E9
| 585062 ||  || — || September 20, 2001 || Apache Point || SDSS Collaboration ||  || align=right data-sort-value="0.67" | 670 m || 
|-id=063 bgcolor=#fefefe
| 585063 ||  || — || October 9, 2004 || Kitt Peak || Spacewatch ||  || align=right data-sort-value="0.65" | 650 m || 
|-id=064 bgcolor=#E9E9E9
| 585064 ||  || — || February 6, 2010 || Mount Lemmon || Mount Lemmon Survey ||  || align=right | 1.9 km || 
|-id=065 bgcolor=#E9E9E9
| 585065 ||  || — || February 14, 2010 || Mount Lemmon || Mount Lemmon Survey ||  || align=right | 1.9 km || 
|-id=066 bgcolor=#E9E9E9
| 585066 ||  || — || December 3, 2008 || Kitt Peak || Spacewatch ||  || align=right | 2.1 km || 
|-id=067 bgcolor=#E9E9E9
| 585067 ||  || — || February 24, 2015 || Haleakala || Pan-STARRS ||  || align=right | 1.3 km || 
|-id=068 bgcolor=#d6d6d6
| 585068 ||  || — || March 26, 2014 || Mount Lemmon || Mount Lemmon Survey ||  || align=right | 3.0 km || 
|-id=069 bgcolor=#E9E9E9
| 585069 ||  || — || November 3, 2005 || Mount Lemmon || Mount Lemmon Survey ||  || align=right data-sort-value="0.91" | 910 m || 
|-id=070 bgcolor=#d6d6d6
| 585070 ||  || — || September 25, 2006 || Kitt Peak || Spacewatch ||  || align=right | 2.8 km || 
|-id=071 bgcolor=#E9E9E9
| 585071 ||  || — || June 22, 1995 || Kitt Peak || Spacewatch ||  || align=right | 1.1 km || 
|-id=072 bgcolor=#fefefe
| 585072 ||  || — || October 31, 2010 || Kitt Peak || Spacewatch ||  || align=right data-sort-value="0.57" | 570 m || 
|-id=073 bgcolor=#E9E9E9
| 585073 ||  || — || October 26, 2013 || Kitt Peak || Spacewatch ||  || align=right data-sort-value="0.99" | 990 m || 
|-id=074 bgcolor=#E9E9E9
| 585074 ||  || — || March 14, 2007 || Mount Lemmon || Mount Lemmon Survey ||  || align=right | 1.3 km || 
|-id=075 bgcolor=#d6d6d6
| 585075 ||  || — || October 23, 2012 || Mount Lemmon || Mount Lemmon Survey ||  || align=right | 1.8 km || 
|-id=076 bgcolor=#E9E9E9
| 585076 ||  || — || January 28, 2015 || Haleakala || Pan-STARRS ||  || align=right | 1.1 km || 
|-id=077 bgcolor=#E9E9E9
| 585077 ||  || — || September 17, 2017 || Haleakala || Pan-STARRS ||  || align=right | 1.7 km || 
|-id=078 bgcolor=#E9E9E9
| 585078 ||  || — || September 30, 2017 || Haleakala || Pan-STARRS ||  || align=right | 1.4 km || 
|-id=079 bgcolor=#E9E9E9
| 585079 ||  || — || September 19, 2017 || Haleakala || Pan-STARRS ||  || align=right | 1.8 km || 
|-id=080 bgcolor=#d6d6d6
| 585080 ||  || — || September 23, 2017 || Haleakala || Pan-STARRS ||  || align=right | 1.7 km || 
|-id=081 bgcolor=#E9E9E9
| 585081 ||  || — || September 23, 2017 || Haleakala || Pan-STARRS ||  || align=right | 1.1 km || 
|-id=082 bgcolor=#E9E9E9
| 585082 ||  || — || September 24, 2017 || Mount Lemmon || Mount Lemmon Survey ||  || align=right | 1.8 km || 
|-id=083 bgcolor=#fefefe
| 585083 ||  || — || September 26, 2017 || Haleakala || Pan-STARRS ||  || align=right data-sort-value="0.57" | 570 m || 
|-id=084 bgcolor=#E9E9E9
| 585084 ||  || — || September 26, 2017 || Haleakala || Pan-STARRS ||  || align=right | 1.8 km || 
|-id=085 bgcolor=#E9E9E9
| 585085 ||  || — || September 24, 2017 || Haleakala || Pan-STARRS ||  || align=right | 1.5 km || 
|-id=086 bgcolor=#d6d6d6
| 585086 ||  || — || September 16, 2017 || Haleakala || Pan-STARRS ||  || align=right | 2.4 km || 
|-id=087 bgcolor=#fefefe
| 585087 ||  || — || December 4, 2007 || Mount Lemmon || Mount Lemmon Survey || H || align=right data-sort-value="0.75" | 750 m || 
|-id=088 bgcolor=#fefefe
| 585088 ||  || — || November 9, 2009 || Mount Lemmon || Mount Lemmon Survey || H || align=right data-sort-value="0.56" | 560 m || 
|-id=089 bgcolor=#E9E9E9
| 585089 ||  || — || September 24, 2009 || Catalina || CSS ||  || align=right data-sort-value="0.94" | 940 m || 
|-id=090 bgcolor=#E9E9E9
| 585090 ||  || — || October 22, 2003 || Apache Point || SDSS Collaboration ||  || align=right | 2.7 km || 
|-id=091 bgcolor=#fefefe
| 585091 ||  || — || March 13, 2016 || Haleakala || Pan-STARRS ||  || align=right data-sort-value="0.89" | 890 m || 
|-id=092 bgcolor=#E9E9E9
| 585092 ||  || — || April 20, 2012 || Mount Lemmon || Mount Lemmon Survey ||  || align=right data-sort-value="0.93" | 930 m || 
|-id=093 bgcolor=#E9E9E9
| 585093 ||  || — || September 28, 2003 || Kitt Peak || Spacewatch ||  || align=right | 2.5 km || 
|-id=094 bgcolor=#d6d6d6
| 585094 ||  || — || March 3, 2000 || Apache Point || SDSS Collaboration ||  || align=right | 2.3 km || 
|-id=095 bgcolor=#d6d6d6
| 585095 ||  || — || February 26, 2014 || Haleakala || Pan-STARRS ||  || align=right | 2.2 km || 
|-id=096 bgcolor=#fefefe
| 585096 ||  || — || October 14, 2017 || Mount Lemmon || Mount Lemmon Survey ||  || align=right data-sort-value="0.57" | 570 m || 
|-id=097 bgcolor=#E9E9E9
| 585097 ||  || — || September 17, 2003 || Kitt Peak || Spacewatch ||  || align=right | 1.5 km || 
|-id=098 bgcolor=#d6d6d6
| 585098 ||  || — || October 2, 2017 || Haleakala || Pan-STARRS ||  || align=right | 2.9 km || 
|-id=099 bgcolor=#fefefe
| 585099 ||  || — || August 19, 2012 || Crni Vrh || B. Mikuž || H || align=right data-sort-value="0.71" | 710 m || 
|-id=100 bgcolor=#d6d6d6
| 585100 ||  || — || November 2, 2006 || Kitt Peak || Spacewatch ||  || align=right | 3.0 km || 
|}

585101–585200 

|-bgcolor=#E9E9E9
| 585101 ||  || — || September 28, 2008 || Socorro || LINEAR ||  || align=right | 1.5 km || 
|-id=102 bgcolor=#E9E9E9
| 585102 ||  || — || August 8, 2013 || Mauna Kea || Mauna Kea Obs. ||  || align=right | 1.6 km || 
|-id=103 bgcolor=#E9E9E9
| 585103 ||  || — || October 1, 2003 || Kitt Peak || Spacewatch ||  || align=right | 2.4 km || 
|-id=104 bgcolor=#E9E9E9
| 585104 ||  || — || September 21, 2017 || Haleakala || Pan-STARRS ||  || align=right | 1.4 km || 
|-id=105 bgcolor=#fefefe
| 585105 ||  || — || August 17, 2006 || Palomar || NEAT ||  || align=right data-sort-value="0.88" | 880 m || 
|-id=106 bgcolor=#E9E9E9
| 585106 ||  || — || May 1, 2006 || Mauna Kea || Mauna Kea Obs. ||  || align=right | 1.9 km || 
|-id=107 bgcolor=#d6d6d6
| 585107 ||  || — || February 20, 2015 || Haleakala || Pan-STARRS ||  || align=right | 3.2 km || 
|-id=108 bgcolor=#E9E9E9
| 585108 ||  || — || October 1, 2008 || Mount Lemmon || Mount Lemmon Survey ||  || align=right | 1.5 km || 
|-id=109 bgcolor=#d6d6d6
| 585109 ||  || — || October 16, 2012 || Oukaimeden || C. Rinner ||  || align=right | 2.7 km || 
|-id=110 bgcolor=#E9E9E9
| 585110 ||  || — || September 23, 2008 || Kitt Peak || Spacewatch ||  || align=right | 2.4 km || 
|-id=111 bgcolor=#E9E9E9
| 585111 ||  || — || May 16, 2012 || Mount Lemmon || Mount Lemmon Survey ||  || align=right data-sort-value="0.87" | 870 m || 
|-id=112 bgcolor=#E9E9E9
| 585112 ||  || — || December 12, 2013 || Haleakala || Pan-STARRS ||  || align=right | 1.6 km || 
|-id=113 bgcolor=#E9E9E9
| 585113 ||  || — || November 8, 2013 || Kitt Peak || Spacewatch ||  || align=right data-sort-value="0.86" | 860 m || 
|-id=114 bgcolor=#d6d6d6
| 585114 ||  || — || September 21, 2001 || Kitt Peak || Spacewatch ||  || align=right | 1.8 km || 
|-id=115 bgcolor=#d6d6d6
| 585115 ||  || — || September 19, 2011 || Mount Lemmon || Mount Lemmon Survey ||  || align=right | 2.7 km || 
|-id=116 bgcolor=#E9E9E9
| 585116 ||  || — || November 28, 2013 || Mount Lemmon || Mount Lemmon Survey ||  || align=right | 1.7 km || 
|-id=117 bgcolor=#d6d6d6
| 585117 ||  || — || October 18, 2012 || Haleakala || Pan-STARRS ||  || align=right | 2.0 km || 
|-id=118 bgcolor=#fefefe
| 585118 ||  || — || September 30, 2006 || Mount Lemmon || Mount Lemmon Survey ||  || align=right data-sort-value="0.64" | 640 m || 
|-id=119 bgcolor=#d6d6d6
| 585119 ||  || — || October 19, 2012 || Haleakala || Pan-STARRS ||  || align=right | 2.8 km || 
|-id=120 bgcolor=#E9E9E9
| 585120 ||  || — || August 23, 2003 || Cerro Tololo || Cerro Tololo Obs. ||  || align=right | 2.1 km || 
|-id=121 bgcolor=#E9E9E9
| 585121 ||  || — || September 12, 2013 || Mount Lemmon || Mount Lemmon Survey ||  || align=right | 1.2 km || 
|-id=122 bgcolor=#E9E9E9
| 585122 ||  || — || December 27, 2005 || Kitt Peak || Spacewatch ||  || align=right data-sort-value="0.72" | 720 m || 
|-id=123 bgcolor=#E9E9E9
| 585123 ||  || — || May 14, 2008 || Kitt Peak || Spacewatch ||  || align=right | 1.1 km || 
|-id=124 bgcolor=#d6d6d6
| 585124 ||  || — || September 20, 2006 || Kitt Peak || Spacewatch ||  || align=right | 2.1 km || 
|-id=125 bgcolor=#d6d6d6
| 585125 ||  || — || April 21, 2009 || Mount Lemmon || Mount Lemmon Survey ||  || align=right | 2.5 km || 
|-id=126 bgcolor=#d6d6d6
| 585126 ||  || — || November 22, 2012 || Kitt Peak || Spacewatch ||  || align=right | 2.2 km || 
|-id=127 bgcolor=#fefefe
| 585127 ||  || — || September 16, 2003 || Kitt Peak || Spacewatch ||  || align=right data-sort-value="0.64" | 640 m || 
|-id=128 bgcolor=#E9E9E9
| 585128 ||  || — || November 2, 2013 || Mount Lemmon || Mount Lemmon Survey ||  || align=right | 1.6 km || 
|-id=129 bgcolor=#E9E9E9
| 585129 ||  || — || March 11, 2007 || Kitt Peak || Spacewatch ||  || align=right | 1.4 km || 
|-id=130 bgcolor=#E9E9E9
| 585130 ||  || — || October 31, 2008 || Mount Lemmon || Mount Lemmon Survey ||  || align=right | 1.9 km || 
|-id=131 bgcolor=#d6d6d6
| 585131 ||  || — || September 17, 2012 || Mount Lemmon || Mount Lemmon Survey ||  || align=right | 2.3 km || 
|-id=132 bgcolor=#E9E9E9
| 585132 ||  || — || June 7, 2016 || Haleakala || Pan-STARRS ||  || align=right | 1.2 km || 
|-id=133 bgcolor=#E9E9E9
| 585133 ||  || — || September 25, 2008 || Mount Lemmon || Mount Lemmon Survey ||  || align=right | 1.8 km || 
|-id=134 bgcolor=#E9E9E9
| 585134 ||  || — || November 26, 2013 || Mount Lemmon || Mount Lemmon Survey ||  || align=right | 1.2 km || 
|-id=135 bgcolor=#E9E9E9
| 585135 ||  || — || September 18, 2003 || Kitt Peak || Spacewatch ||  || align=right | 1.9 km || 
|-id=136 bgcolor=#fefefe
| 585136 ||  || — || October 11, 2010 || Catalina || CSS ||  || align=right data-sort-value="0.69" | 690 m || 
|-id=137 bgcolor=#E9E9E9
| 585137 ||  || — || October 12, 1999 || Kitt Peak || Spacewatch ||  || align=right | 1.7 km || 
|-id=138 bgcolor=#E9E9E9
| 585138 ||  || — || September 23, 2000 || Socorro || LINEAR ||  || align=right | 1.0 km || 
|-id=139 bgcolor=#d6d6d6
| 585139 ||  || — || June 7, 2016 || Haleakala || Pan-STARRS || 7:4 || align=right | 3.3 km || 
|-id=140 bgcolor=#E9E9E9
| 585140 ||  || — || August 6, 2004 || Palomar || NEAT ||  || align=right | 1.9 km || 
|-id=141 bgcolor=#fefefe
| 585141 ||  || — || December 10, 2012 || Haleakala || Pan-STARRS || H || align=right data-sort-value="0.71" | 710 m || 
|-id=142 bgcolor=#E9E9E9
| 585142 ||  || — || November 27, 2013 || Haleakala || Pan-STARRS ||  || align=right | 1.3 km || 
|-id=143 bgcolor=#E9E9E9
| 585143 ||  || — || August 10, 2012 || Kitt Peak || Spacewatch ||  || align=right | 1.2 km || 
|-id=144 bgcolor=#E9E9E9
| 585144 ||  || — || August 25, 2012 || Mount Lemmon || Mount Lemmon Survey ||  || align=right | 1.9 km || 
|-id=145 bgcolor=#E9E9E9
| 585145 ||  || — || November 8, 2008 || Mount Lemmon || Mount Lemmon Survey ||  || align=right | 1.6 km || 
|-id=146 bgcolor=#d6d6d6
| 585146 ||  || — || July 5, 2016 || Haleakala || Pan-STARRS ||  || align=right | 2.2 km || 
|-id=147 bgcolor=#d6d6d6
| 585147 ||  || — || December 20, 2007 || Kitt Peak || Spacewatch ||  || align=right | 2.2 km || 
|-id=148 bgcolor=#d6d6d6
| 585148 ||  || — || January 26, 2014 || Haleakala || Pan-STARRS ||  || align=right | 2.2 km || 
|-id=149 bgcolor=#d6d6d6
| 585149 ||  || — || February 27, 2014 || Haleakala || Pan-STARRS ||  || align=right | 1.9 km || 
|-id=150 bgcolor=#d6d6d6
| 585150 ||  || — || March 28, 2015 || Haleakala || Pan-STARRS ||  || align=right | 2.2 km || 
|-id=151 bgcolor=#E9E9E9
| 585151 ||  || — || October 9, 2008 || Kitt Peak || Spacewatch ||  || align=right | 1.1 km || 
|-id=152 bgcolor=#E9E9E9
| 585152 ||  || — || October 9, 2012 || Mount Lemmon || Mount Lemmon Survey ||  || align=right | 1.5 km || 
|-id=153 bgcolor=#d6d6d6
| 585153 ||  || — || October 27, 2017 || Haleakala || Pan-STARRS ||  || align=right | 2.4 km || 
|-id=154 bgcolor=#d6d6d6
| 585154 ||  || — || September 19, 2001 || Kitt Peak || Spacewatch ||  || align=right | 2.0 km || 
|-id=155 bgcolor=#E9E9E9
| 585155 ||  || — || May 8, 2011 || Mount Lemmon || Mount Lemmon Survey ||  || align=right | 1.5 km || 
|-id=156 bgcolor=#E9E9E9
| 585156 ||  || — || October 29, 2017 || Haleakala || Pan-STARRS ||  || align=right | 2.1 km || 
|-id=157 bgcolor=#fefefe
| 585157 ||  || — || September 23, 2017 || Haleakala || Pan-STARRS ||  || align=right data-sort-value="0.52" | 520 m || 
|-id=158 bgcolor=#d6d6d6
| 585158 ||  || — || October 23, 2017 || Mount Lemmon || Mount Lemmon Survey ||  || align=right | 2.5 km || 
|-id=159 bgcolor=#d6d6d6
| 585159 ||  || — || October 21, 2017 || Mount Lemmon || Mount Lemmon Survey ||  || align=right | 1.8 km || 
|-id=160 bgcolor=#E9E9E9
| 585160 ||  || — || November 24, 2008 || Kitt Peak || Spacewatch ||  || align=right | 1.8 km || 
|-id=161 bgcolor=#E9E9E9
| 585161 ||  || — || September 17, 2012 || Mount Lemmon || Mount Lemmon Survey ||  || align=right | 1.6 km || 
|-id=162 bgcolor=#d6d6d6
| 585162 ||  || — || October 29, 2017 || Haleakala || Pan-STARRS ||  || align=right | 1.8 km || 
|-id=163 bgcolor=#d6d6d6
| 585163 ||  || — || October 21, 2012 || Kitt Peak || Spacewatch ||  || align=right | 1.7 km || 
|-id=164 bgcolor=#d6d6d6
| 585164 ||  || — || October 19, 2017 || Haleakala || Pan-STARRS ||  || align=right | 1.7 km || 
|-id=165 bgcolor=#d6d6d6
| 585165 ||  || — || October 23, 2017 || Mount Lemmon || Mount Lemmon Survey ||  || align=right | 1.9 km || 
|-id=166 bgcolor=#d6d6d6
| 585166 ||  || — || October 23, 2017 || Mount Lemmon || Mount Lemmon Survey ||  || align=right | 2.6 km || 
|-id=167 bgcolor=#E9E9E9
| 585167 ||  || — || September 26, 2008 || Mount Lemmon || Mount Lemmon Survey ||  || align=right | 1.6 km || 
|-id=168 bgcolor=#E9E9E9
| 585168 ||  || — || September 23, 2008 || Mount Lemmon || Mount Lemmon Survey ||  || align=right | 1.6 km || 
|-id=169 bgcolor=#E9E9E9
| 585169 ||  || — || September 29, 2003 || Kitt Peak || Spacewatch ||  || align=right | 1.7 km || 
|-id=170 bgcolor=#E9E9E9
| 585170 ||  || — || February 2, 2002 || Palomar || NEAT ||  || align=right data-sort-value="0.97" | 970 m || 
|-id=171 bgcolor=#E9E9E9
| 585171 ||  || — || October 6, 2008 || Catalina || CSS ||  || align=right | 1.7 km || 
|-id=172 bgcolor=#d6d6d6
| 585172 ||  || — || August 30, 2011 || Zelenchukskaya Stn || T. V. Kryachko, B. Satovski ||  || align=right | 2.9 km || 
|-id=173 bgcolor=#E9E9E9
| 585173 ||  || — || November 20, 2008 || Kitt Peak || Spacewatch ||  || align=right | 2.1 km || 
|-id=174 bgcolor=#d6d6d6
| 585174 ||  || — || September 18, 2001 || Apache Point || SDSS Collaboration ||  || align=right | 2.7 km || 
|-id=175 bgcolor=#E9E9E9
| 585175 ||  || — || November 30, 2003 || Kitt Peak || Spacewatch ||  || align=right | 2.1 km || 
|-id=176 bgcolor=#E9E9E9
| 585176 ||  || — || October 24, 2008 || Catalina || CSS ||  || align=right | 2.3 km || 
|-id=177 bgcolor=#d6d6d6
| 585177 ||  || — || September 25, 2017 || Haleakala || Pan-STARRS ||  || align=right | 1.9 km || 
|-id=178 bgcolor=#d6d6d6
| 585178 ||  || — || January 10, 2013 || Mount Lemmon || Mount Lemmon Survey ||  || align=right | 2.8 km || 
|-id=179 bgcolor=#d6d6d6
| 585179 ||  || — || January 10, 2013 || Haleakala || Pan-STARRS || 7:4 || align=right | 3.2 km || 
|-id=180 bgcolor=#E9E9E9
| 585180 ||  || — || November 7, 2008 || Mount Lemmon || Mount Lemmon Survey ||  || align=right | 1.6 km || 
|-id=181 bgcolor=#d6d6d6
| 585181 ||  || — || September 24, 2011 || Mount Lemmon || Mount Lemmon Survey ||  || align=right | 2.4 km || 
|-id=182 bgcolor=#d6d6d6
| 585182 ||  || — || January 13, 2013 || Nogales || M. Schwartz, P. R. Holvorcem ||  || align=right | 2.8 km || 
|-id=183 bgcolor=#E9E9E9
| 585183 ||  || — || August 16, 2012 || Haleakala || Pan-STARRS ||  || align=right | 1.4 km || 
|-id=184 bgcolor=#E9E9E9
| 585184 ||  || — || June 4, 2016 || Mount Lemmon || Mount Lemmon Survey ||  || align=right | 1.4 km || 
|-id=185 bgcolor=#FFC2E0
| 585185 ||  || — || November 12, 2017 || Mount Lemmon || Mount Lemmon Survey || APO || align=right data-sort-value="0.29" | 290 m || 
|-id=186 bgcolor=#fefefe
| 585186 ||  || — || October 20, 2017 || Mount Lemmon || Mount Lemmon Survey || H || align=right data-sort-value="0.59" | 590 m || 
|-id=187 bgcolor=#d6d6d6
| 585187 ||  || — || September 19, 2011 || Mount Lemmon || Mount Lemmon Survey ||  || align=right | 2.8 km || 
|-id=188 bgcolor=#d6d6d6
| 585188 ||  || — || December 16, 2007 || Mount Lemmon || Mount Lemmon Survey ||  || align=right | 2.9 km || 
|-id=189 bgcolor=#d6d6d6
| 585189 ||  || — || June 16, 2010 || Mount Lemmon || Mount Lemmon Survey ||  || align=right | 3.0 km || 
|-id=190 bgcolor=#E9E9E9
| 585190 ||  || — || February 27, 2015 || Haleakala || Pan-STARRS ||  || align=right | 1.8 km || 
|-id=191 bgcolor=#E9E9E9
| 585191 ||  || — || October 12, 2013 || Kitt Peak || Spacewatch ||  || align=right data-sort-value="0.78" | 780 m || 
|-id=192 bgcolor=#E9E9E9
| 585192 ||  || — || December 2, 2005 || Mauna Kea || Mauna Kea Obs. ||  || align=right | 1.8 km || 
|-id=193 bgcolor=#fefefe
| 585193 ||  || — || April 2, 2009 || Kitt Peak || Spacewatch ||  || align=right data-sort-value="0.78" | 780 m || 
|-id=194 bgcolor=#E9E9E9
| 585194 ||  || — || September 24, 2012 || Mount Lemmon || Mount Lemmon Survey ||  || align=right | 1.6 km || 
|-id=195 bgcolor=#E9E9E9
| 585195 ||  || — || October 10, 2004 || Kitt Peak || Spacewatch ||  || align=right | 1.2 km || 
|-id=196 bgcolor=#d6d6d6
| 585196 ||  || — || December 3, 2012 || Mount Lemmon || Mount Lemmon Survey ||  || align=right | 2.4 km || 
|-id=197 bgcolor=#E9E9E9
| 585197 ||  || — || September 19, 2003 || Kitt Peak || Spacewatch ||  || align=right | 1.7 km || 
|-id=198 bgcolor=#E9E9E9
| 585198 ||  || — || February 20, 2015 || Haleakala || Pan-STARRS ||  || align=right | 1.9 km || 
|-id=199 bgcolor=#d6d6d6
| 585199 ||  || — || March 8, 2014 || Mount Lemmon || Mount Lemmon Survey ||  || align=right | 2.5 km || 
|-id=200 bgcolor=#E9E9E9
| 585200 ||  || — || May 21, 2012 || Mount Lemmon || Mount Lemmon Survey ||  || align=right | 1.8 km || 
|}

585201–585300 

|-bgcolor=#d6d6d6
| 585201 ||  || — || December 2, 2012 || Mount Lemmon || Mount Lemmon Survey ||  || align=right | 2.7 km || 
|-id=202 bgcolor=#E9E9E9
| 585202 ||  || — || November 10, 2009 || Mount Lemmon || Mount Lemmon Survey ||  || align=right data-sort-value="0.80" | 800 m || 
|-id=203 bgcolor=#E9E9E9
| 585203 ||  || — || October 21, 2008 || Kitt Peak || Spacewatch ||  || align=right | 1.9 km || 
|-id=204 bgcolor=#d6d6d6
| 585204 ||  || — || October 14, 2001 || Kitt Peak || Spacewatch ||  || align=right | 2.6 km || 
|-id=205 bgcolor=#d6d6d6
| 585205 ||  || — || June 13, 2015 || Haleakala || Pan-STARRS ||  || align=right | 2.9 km || 
|-id=206 bgcolor=#fefefe
| 585206 ||  || — || December 11, 2014 || Mount Lemmon || Mount Lemmon Survey ||  || align=right data-sort-value="0.52" | 520 m || 
|-id=207 bgcolor=#E9E9E9
| 585207 ||  || — || June 9, 2011 || Mount Lemmon || Mount Lemmon Survey ||  || align=right | 1.9 km || 
|-id=208 bgcolor=#E9E9E9
| 585208 ||  || — || September 14, 2007 || Kitt Peak || Spacewatch ||  || align=right | 1.7 km || 
|-id=209 bgcolor=#fefefe
| 585209 ||  || — || November 5, 1996 || Kitt Peak || Spacewatch ||  || align=right data-sort-value="0.75" | 750 m || 
|-id=210 bgcolor=#E9E9E9
| 585210 ||  || — || March 12, 2010 || Kitt Peak || Spacewatch ||  || align=right | 2.1 km || 
|-id=211 bgcolor=#d6d6d6
| 585211 ||  || — || March 21, 2009 || Kitt Peak || Spacewatch ||  || align=right | 2.9 km || 
|-id=212 bgcolor=#fefefe
| 585212 ||  || — || March 28, 2016 || Mount Lemmon || Mount Lemmon Survey ||  || align=right data-sort-value="0.71" | 710 m || 
|-id=213 bgcolor=#E9E9E9
| 585213 ||  || — || September 22, 2008 || Kitt Peak || Spacewatch ||  || align=right | 2.0 km || 
|-id=214 bgcolor=#E9E9E9
| 585214 ||  || — || September 24, 2012 || Kitt Peak || Spacewatch ||  || align=right | 1.8 km || 
|-id=215 bgcolor=#E9E9E9
| 585215 ||  || — || September 30, 2003 || Kitt Peak || Spacewatch ||  || align=right | 1.7 km || 
|-id=216 bgcolor=#d6d6d6
| 585216 ||  || — || September 14, 2007 || Mount Lemmon || Mount Lemmon Survey ||  || align=right | 1.5 km || 
|-id=217 bgcolor=#E9E9E9
| 585217 ||  || — || September 18, 2012 || Mount Lemmon || Mount Lemmon Survey ||  || align=right | 1.9 km || 
|-id=218 bgcolor=#E9E9E9
| 585218 ||  || — || February 17, 2015 || Haleakala || Pan-STARRS ||  || align=right | 1.3 km || 
|-id=219 bgcolor=#d6d6d6
| 585219 ||  || — || August 24, 2011 || Siding Spring || SSS ||  || align=right | 2.0 km || 
|-id=220 bgcolor=#fefefe
| 585220 ||  || — || May 28, 2014 || Haleakala || Pan-STARRS || H || align=right data-sort-value="0.59" | 590 m || 
|-id=221 bgcolor=#d6d6d6
| 585221 ||  || — || February 10, 2008 || Mount Lemmon || Mount Lemmon Survey ||  || align=right | 3.5 km || 
|-id=222 bgcolor=#d6d6d6
| 585222 ||  || — || February 24, 2014 || Haleakala || Pan-STARRS ||  || align=right | 1.9 km || 
|-id=223 bgcolor=#d6d6d6
| 585223 ||  || — || November 10, 2017 || Haleakala || Pan-STARRS ||  || align=right | 2.0 km || 
|-id=224 bgcolor=#E9E9E9
| 585224 ||  || — || October 19, 2017 || Haleakala || Pan-STARRS ||  || align=right | 1.6 km || 
|-id=225 bgcolor=#d6d6d6
| 585225 ||  || — || December 22, 2006 || Mount Lemmon || Mount Lemmon Survey ||  || align=right | 2.4 km || 
|-id=226 bgcolor=#E9E9E9
| 585226 ||  || — || September 21, 2012 || Kitt Peak || Spacewatch ||  || align=right | 1.7 km || 
|-id=227 bgcolor=#d6d6d6
| 585227 ||  || — || October 19, 2006 || Mount Lemmon || Mount Lemmon Survey ||  || align=right | 2.6 km || 
|-id=228 bgcolor=#E9E9E9
| 585228 ||  || — || October 8, 2012 || Haleakala || Pan-STARRS ||  || align=right | 2.2 km || 
|-id=229 bgcolor=#d6d6d6
| 585229 ||  || — || August 2, 2016 || Haleakala || Pan-STARRS ||  || align=right | 3.3 km || 
|-id=230 bgcolor=#E9E9E9
| 585230 ||  || — || June 8, 2011 || Mount Lemmon || Mount Lemmon Survey ||  || align=right | 2.5 km || 
|-id=231 bgcolor=#d6d6d6
| 585231 ||  || — || August 14, 2016 || Haleakala || Pan-STARRS ||  || align=right | 2.4 km || 
|-id=232 bgcolor=#E9E9E9
| 585232 ||  || — || December 2, 2005 || Kitt Peak || Spacewatch ||  || align=right | 1.3 km || 
|-id=233 bgcolor=#E9E9E9
| 585233 ||  || — || December 19, 2009 || Kitt Peak || Spacewatch ||  || align=right data-sort-value="0.73" | 730 m || 
|-id=234 bgcolor=#d6d6d6
| 585234 ||  || — || October 30, 2011 || ESA OGS || ESA OGS ||  || align=right | 2.2 km || 
|-id=235 bgcolor=#E9E9E9
| 585235 ||  || — || October 9, 2008 || Kitt Peak || Spacewatch ||  || align=right | 1.2 km || 
|-id=236 bgcolor=#E9E9E9
| 585236 ||  || — || March 11, 2011 || Mount Lemmon || Mount Lemmon Survey ||  || align=right data-sort-value="0.91" | 910 m || 
|-id=237 bgcolor=#E9E9E9
| 585237 ||  || — || January 4, 2006 || Kitt Peak || Spacewatch ||  || align=right | 1.4 km || 
|-id=238 bgcolor=#E9E9E9
| 585238 ||  || — || November 26, 2013 || Mount Lemmon || Mount Lemmon Survey ||  || align=right | 1.2 km || 
|-id=239 bgcolor=#E9E9E9
| 585239 ||  || — || November 4, 2004 || Catalina || CSS ||  || align=right | 1.4 km || 
|-id=240 bgcolor=#d6d6d6
| 585240 ||  || — || January 25, 2003 || Palomar || NEAT ||  || align=right | 3.2 km || 
|-id=241 bgcolor=#d6d6d6
| 585241 ||  || — || November 25, 2006 || Mount Lemmon || Mount Lemmon Survey ||  || align=right | 2.9 km || 
|-id=242 bgcolor=#E9E9E9
| 585242 ||  || — || November 19, 1995 || Kitt Peak || Spacewatch ||  || align=right | 1.2 km || 
|-id=243 bgcolor=#d6d6d6
| 585243 ||  || — || August 1, 2016 || Haleakala || Pan-STARRS ||  || align=right | 2.3 km || 
|-id=244 bgcolor=#d6d6d6
| 585244 ||  || — || February 14, 2009 || Mount Lemmon || Mount Lemmon Survey ||  || align=right | 1.8 km || 
|-id=245 bgcolor=#d6d6d6
| 585245 ||  || — || January 10, 2013 || Haleakala || Pan-STARRS ||  || align=right | 2.9 km || 
|-id=246 bgcolor=#d6d6d6
| 585246 ||  || — || June 8, 2016 || Haleakala || Pan-STARRS ||  || align=right | 2.0 km || 
|-id=247 bgcolor=#d6d6d6
| 585247 ||  || — || May 12, 2015 || Mount Lemmon || Mount Lemmon Survey ||  || align=right | 2.1 km || 
|-id=248 bgcolor=#d6d6d6
| 585248 ||  || — || August 29, 2016 || Mount Lemmon || Mount Lemmon Survey ||  || align=right | 2.2 km || 
|-id=249 bgcolor=#d6d6d6
| 585249 ||  || — || August 30, 2016 || Mount Lemmon || Mount Lemmon Survey ||  || align=right | 2.7 km || 
|-id=250 bgcolor=#d6d6d6
| 585250 ||  || — || April 8, 2014 || Mount Lemmon || Mount Lemmon Survey ||  || align=right | 2.8 km || 
|-id=251 bgcolor=#d6d6d6
| 585251 ||  || — || November 1, 2006 || Kitt Peak || Spacewatch ||  || align=right | 2.1 km || 
|-id=252 bgcolor=#d6d6d6
| 585252 ||  || — || March 12, 2014 || Mount Lemmon || Mount Lemmon Survey ||  || align=right | 2.3 km || 
|-id=253 bgcolor=#E9E9E9
| 585253 ||  || — || November 26, 2013 || Haleakala || Pan-STARRS ||  || align=right data-sort-value="0.74" | 740 m || 
|-id=254 bgcolor=#E9E9E9
| 585254 ||  || — || April 2, 2011 || Mount Lemmon || Mount Lemmon Survey ||  || align=right | 1.7 km || 
|-id=255 bgcolor=#d6d6d6
| 585255 ||  || — || May 21, 2015 || Haleakala || Pan-STARRS ||  || align=right | 2.2 km || 
|-id=256 bgcolor=#d6d6d6
| 585256 ||  || — || November 6, 2012 || Mount Lemmon || Mount Lemmon Survey ||  || align=right | 2.3 km || 
|-id=257 bgcolor=#d6d6d6
| 585257 ||  || — || November 12, 2012 || Mount Lemmon || Mount Lemmon Survey ||  || align=right | 2.1 km || 
|-id=258 bgcolor=#fefefe
| 585258 ||  || — || February 26, 2008 || Mount Lemmon || Mount Lemmon Survey ||  || align=right data-sort-value="0.59" | 590 m || 
|-id=259 bgcolor=#d6d6d6
| 585259 ||  || — || October 22, 2012 || Haleakala || Pan-STARRS ||  || align=right | 2.1 km || 
|-id=260 bgcolor=#fefefe
| 585260 ||  || — || February 18, 2008 || Mount Lemmon || Mount Lemmon Survey ||  || align=right data-sort-value="0.61" | 610 m || 
|-id=261 bgcolor=#d6d6d6
| 585261 ||  || — || October 20, 2017 || Mount Lemmon || Mount Lemmon Survey ||  || align=right | 2.1 km || 
|-id=262 bgcolor=#E9E9E9
| 585262 ||  || — || September 25, 2008 || Mount Lemmon || Mount Lemmon Survey ||  || align=right | 1.1 km || 
|-id=263 bgcolor=#E9E9E9
| 585263 ||  || — || August 10, 2007 || Kitt Peak || Spacewatch ||  || align=right | 1.7 km || 
|-id=264 bgcolor=#d6d6d6
| 585264 ||  || — || February 28, 2014 || Haleakala || Pan-STARRS ||  || align=right | 1.8 km || 
|-id=265 bgcolor=#d6d6d6
| 585265 ||  || — || September 17, 1995 || Kitt Peak || Spacewatch ||  || align=right | 2.2 km || 
|-id=266 bgcolor=#fefefe
| 585266 ||  || — || September 16, 2006 || Kitt Peak || Spacewatch ||  || align=right data-sort-value="0.63" | 630 m || 
|-id=267 bgcolor=#d6d6d6
| 585267 ||  || — || December 22, 2012 || Haleakala || Pan-STARRS ||  || align=right | 2.9 km || 
|-id=268 bgcolor=#E9E9E9
| 585268 ||  || — || December 6, 2008 || Kitt Peak || Spacewatch ||  || align=right | 1.8 km || 
|-id=269 bgcolor=#E9E9E9
| 585269 ||  || — || June 16, 2012 || Mount Lemmon || Mount Lemmon Survey ||  || align=right data-sort-value="0.85" | 850 m || 
|-id=270 bgcolor=#d6d6d6
| 585270 ||  || — || May 24, 2015 || Haleakala || Pan-STARRS ||  || align=right | 2.4 km || 
|-id=271 bgcolor=#fefefe
| 585271 ||  || — || October 10, 2007 || Mount Lemmon || Mount Lemmon Survey ||  || align=right data-sort-value="0.62" | 620 m || 
|-id=272 bgcolor=#E9E9E9
| 585272 ||  || — || November 20, 2008 || Mount Lemmon || Mount Lemmon Survey ||  || align=right | 1.6 km || 
|-id=273 bgcolor=#fefefe
| 585273 ||  || — || September 15, 2007 || Mount Lemmon || Mount Lemmon Survey ||  || align=right data-sort-value="0.49" | 490 m || 
|-id=274 bgcolor=#E9E9E9
| 585274 ||  || — || April 24, 2006 || Kitt Peak || Spacewatch ||  || align=right | 2.1 km || 
|-id=275 bgcolor=#E9E9E9
| 585275 ||  || — || November 1, 2008 || Kitt Peak || Spacewatch ||  || align=right | 1.2 km || 
|-id=276 bgcolor=#E9E9E9
| 585276 ||  || — || December 6, 2013 || Haleakala || Pan-STARRS ||  || align=right | 1.4 km || 
|-id=277 bgcolor=#d6d6d6
| 585277 ||  || — || November 13, 2007 || Kitt Peak || Spacewatch ||  || align=right | 2.3 km || 
|-id=278 bgcolor=#E9E9E9
| 585278 ||  || — || April 24, 2003 || Kitt Peak || Spacewatch ||  || align=right | 1.0 km || 
|-id=279 bgcolor=#d6d6d6
| 585279 ||  || — || November 14, 2017 || Mount Lemmon || Mount Lemmon Survey ||  || align=right | 2.3 km || 
|-id=280 bgcolor=#d6d6d6
| 585280 ||  || — || March 24, 2014 || Haleakala || Pan-STARRS ||  || align=right | 2.2 km || 
|-id=281 bgcolor=#d6d6d6
| 585281 ||  || — || September 27, 2006 || Kitt Peak || Spacewatch ||  || align=right | 2.3 km || 
|-id=282 bgcolor=#d6d6d6
| 585282 ||  || — || September 25, 2012 || Mount Lemmon || Mount Lemmon Survey ||  || align=right | 2.2 km || 
|-id=283 bgcolor=#d6d6d6
| 585283 ||  || — || December 3, 2012 || Mount Lemmon || Mount Lemmon Survey ||  || align=right | 2.0 km || 
|-id=284 bgcolor=#d6d6d6
| 585284 ||  || — || October 3, 2006 || Mount Lemmon || Mount Lemmon Survey ||  || align=right | 3.1 km || 
|-id=285 bgcolor=#E9E9E9
| 585285 ||  || — || August 25, 2012 || Haleakala || Pan-STARRS ||  || align=right | 1.1 km || 
|-id=286 bgcolor=#E9E9E9
| 585286 ||  || — || October 19, 2003 || Kitt Peak || Spacewatch ||  || align=right | 1.4 km || 
|-id=287 bgcolor=#d6d6d6
| 585287 ||  || — || February 11, 2014 || Mount Lemmon || Mount Lemmon Survey ||  || align=right | 2.4 km || 
|-id=288 bgcolor=#E9E9E9
| 585288 ||  || — || October 29, 2008 || Mount Lemmon || Mount Lemmon Survey ||  || align=right | 1.5 km || 
|-id=289 bgcolor=#E9E9E9
| 585289 ||  || — || October 18, 2003 || Palomar || NEAT ||  || align=right | 2.0 km || 
|-id=290 bgcolor=#fefefe
| 585290 ||  || — || June 30, 2013 || Haleakala || Pan-STARRS ||  || align=right data-sort-value="0.61" | 610 m || 
|-id=291 bgcolor=#d6d6d6
| 585291 ||  || — || February 24, 2014 || Haleakala || Pan-STARRS ||  || align=right | 2.3 km || 
|-id=292 bgcolor=#d6d6d6
| 585292 ||  || — || April 5, 2014 || Haleakala || Pan-STARRS ||  || align=right | 2.3 km || 
|-id=293 bgcolor=#E9E9E9
| 585293 ||  || — || May 27, 2012 || Mount Lemmon || Mount Lemmon Survey ||  || align=right | 1.0 km || 
|-id=294 bgcolor=#d6d6d6
| 585294 ||  || — || December 13, 2012 || Mount Lemmon || Mount Lemmon Survey ||  || align=right | 2.1 km || 
|-id=295 bgcolor=#d6d6d6
| 585295 ||  || — || October 23, 2012 || Mount Lemmon || Mount Lemmon Survey ||  || align=right | 2.5 km || 
|-id=296 bgcolor=#E9E9E9
| 585296 ||  || — || October 22, 2017 || Mount Lemmon || Mount Lemmon Survey ||  || align=right | 1.2 km || 
|-id=297 bgcolor=#d6d6d6
| 585297 ||  || — || October 28, 2017 || Haleakala || Pan-STARRS ||  || align=right | 1.9 km || 
|-id=298 bgcolor=#d6d6d6
| 585298 ||  || — || October 30, 2017 || Haleakala || Pan-STARRS ||  || align=right | 1.9 km || 
|-id=299 bgcolor=#d6d6d6
| 585299 ||  || — || August 30, 2016 || Mount Lemmon || Mount Lemmon Survey ||  || align=right | 3.1 km || 
|-id=300 bgcolor=#E9E9E9
| 585300 ||  || — || October 29, 2008 || Kitt Peak || Spacewatch ||  || align=right | 1.7 km || 
|}

585301–585400 

|-bgcolor=#E9E9E9
| 585301 ||  || — || October 20, 2003 || Palomar || NEAT ||  || align=right | 1.9 km || 
|-id=302 bgcolor=#E9E9E9
| 585302 ||  || — || June 14, 2012 || Mount Lemmon || Mount Lemmon Survey ||  || align=right data-sort-value="0.95" | 950 m || 
|-id=303 bgcolor=#fefefe
| 585303 ||  || — || April 26, 2006 || Mount Lemmon || Mount Lemmon Survey ||  || align=right data-sort-value="0.71" | 710 m || 
|-id=304 bgcolor=#d6d6d6
| 585304 ||  || — || August 7, 2016 || Haleakala || Pan-STARRS ||  || align=right | 2.2 km || 
|-id=305 bgcolor=#d6d6d6
| 585305 ||  || — || December 4, 2007 || Kitt Peak || Spacewatch ||  || align=right | 2.3 km || 
|-id=306 bgcolor=#fefefe
| 585306 ||  || — || February 8, 2011 || Mount Lemmon || Mount Lemmon Survey ||  || align=right data-sort-value="0.71" | 710 m || 
|-id=307 bgcolor=#E9E9E9
| 585307 ||  || — || October 16, 2012 || Mount Lemmon || Mount Lemmon Survey ||  || align=right | 1.5 km || 
|-id=308 bgcolor=#E9E9E9
| 585308 ||  || — || December 9, 2017 || Mount Lemmon || Mount Lemmon Survey ||  || align=right data-sort-value="0.96" | 960 m || 
|-id=309 bgcolor=#d6d6d6
| 585309 ||  || — || September 8, 2016 || Haleakala || Pan-STARRS ||  || align=right | 2.6 km || 
|-id=310 bgcolor=#FFC2E0
| 585310 ||  || — || December 20, 2017 || Mount Lemmon || Mount Lemmon Survey || APOPHA || align=right data-sort-value="0.29" | 290 m || 
|-id=311 bgcolor=#fefefe
| 585311 ||  || — || July 27, 2011 || Haleakala || Pan-STARRS || H || align=right data-sort-value="0.82" | 820 m || 
|-id=312 bgcolor=#d6d6d6
| 585312 ||  || — || November 21, 2017 || Mount Lemmon || Mount Lemmon Survey || Tj (2.99) || align=right | 3.4 km || 
|-id=313 bgcolor=#E9E9E9
| 585313 ||  || — || October 7, 2004 || Kitt Peak || Spacewatch ||  || align=right data-sort-value="0.83" | 830 m || 
|-id=314 bgcolor=#E9E9E9
| 585314 ||  || — || October 22, 2003 || Apache Point || SDSS Collaboration ||  || align=right | 2.3 km || 
|-id=315 bgcolor=#E9E9E9
| 585315 ||  || — || June 21, 2007 || Mount Lemmon || Mount Lemmon Survey ||  || align=right | 1.1 km || 
|-id=316 bgcolor=#E9E9E9
| 585316 ||  || — || March 17, 2015 || Haleakala || Pan-STARRS ||  || align=right data-sort-value="0.79" | 790 m || 
|-id=317 bgcolor=#E9E9E9
| 585317 ||  || — || January 28, 2015 || Haleakala || Pan-STARRS ||  || align=right | 1.5 km || 
|-id=318 bgcolor=#d6d6d6
| 585318 ||  || — || November 16, 2011 || Mount Lemmon || Mount Lemmon Survey ||  || align=right | 2.5 km || 
|-id=319 bgcolor=#E9E9E9
| 585319 ||  || — || August 14, 2012 || Haleakala || Pan-STARRS ||  || align=right | 1.5 km || 
|-id=320 bgcolor=#fefefe
| 585320 ||  || — || October 16, 2006 || Catalina || CSS ||  || align=right data-sort-value="0.84" | 840 m || 
|-id=321 bgcolor=#d6d6d6
| 585321 ||  || — || October 23, 2011 || Catalina || CSS || Tj (2.91) || align=right | 3.7 km || 
|-id=322 bgcolor=#d6d6d6
| 585322 ||  || — || October 31, 2011 || Mayhill-ISON || L. Elenin ||  || align=right | 3.4 km || 
|-id=323 bgcolor=#fefefe
| 585323 ||  || — || October 19, 2003 || Palomar || NEAT ||  || align=right data-sort-value="0.86" | 860 m || 
|-id=324 bgcolor=#fefefe
| 585324 ||  || — || May 16, 2007 || Mount Lemmon || Mount Lemmon Survey ||  || align=right data-sort-value="0.94" | 940 m || 
|-id=325 bgcolor=#E9E9E9
| 585325 ||  || — || December 23, 2017 || Haleakala || Pan-STARRS ||  || align=right data-sort-value="0.86" | 860 m || 
|-id=326 bgcolor=#E9E9E9
| 585326 ||  || — || March 4, 1997 || Kitt Peak || Spacewatch ||  || align=right | 1.8 km || 
|-id=327 bgcolor=#fefefe
| 585327 ||  || — || December 23, 2017 || Haleakala || Pan-STARRS ||  || align=right data-sort-value="0.75" | 750 m || 
|-id=328 bgcolor=#E9E9E9
| 585328 ||  || — || November 25, 2013 || Haleakala || Pan-STARRS ||  || align=right | 3.1 km || 
|-id=329 bgcolor=#E9E9E9
| 585329 ||  || — || October 21, 2012 || Haleakala || Pan-STARRS ||  || align=right | 1.6 km || 
|-id=330 bgcolor=#E9E9E9
| 585330 ||  || — || February 20, 2014 || Mount Lemmon || Mount Lemmon Survey ||  || align=right | 1.6 km || 
|-id=331 bgcolor=#d6d6d6
| 585331 ||  || — || September 27, 2016 || Haleakala || Pan-STARRS ||  || align=right | 2.3 km || 
|-id=332 bgcolor=#E9E9E9
| 585332 ||  || — || February 10, 2014 || Haleakala || Pan-STARRS ||  || align=right | 2.0 km || 
|-id=333 bgcolor=#d6d6d6
| 585333 ||  || — || September 27, 2016 || Haleakala || Pan-STARRS ||  || align=right | 2.6 km || 
|-id=334 bgcolor=#fefefe
| 585334 ||  || — || December 3, 2007 || Kitt Peak || Spacewatch ||  || align=right data-sort-value="0.75" | 750 m || 
|-id=335 bgcolor=#fefefe
| 585335 ||  || — || January 11, 2003 || Kitt Peak || Spacewatch ||  || align=right data-sort-value="0.90" | 900 m || 
|-id=336 bgcolor=#d6d6d6
| 585336 ||  || — || September 4, 2016 || Mount Lemmon || Mount Lemmon Survey ||  || align=right | 2.5 km || 
|-id=337 bgcolor=#d6d6d6
| 585337 ||  || — || August 10, 2015 || Haleakala || Pan-STARRS ||  || align=right | 2.4 km || 
|-id=338 bgcolor=#d6d6d6
| 585338 ||  || — || April 29, 2014 || Haleakala || Pan-STARRS ||  || align=right | 2.8 km || 
|-id=339 bgcolor=#d6d6d6
| 585339 ||  || — || November 25, 2011 || Haleakala || Pan-STARRS ||  || align=right | 2.8 km || 
|-id=340 bgcolor=#d6d6d6
| 585340 ||  || — || December 24, 2011 || Mount Lemmon || Mount Lemmon Survey ||  || align=right | 3.4 km || 
|-id=341 bgcolor=#d6d6d6
| 585341 ||  || — || July 23, 2015 || Haleakala || Pan-STARRS ||  || align=right | 3.1 km || 
|-id=342 bgcolor=#d6d6d6
| 585342 ||  || — || October 25, 2011 || Haleakala || Pan-STARRS ||  || align=right | 2.1 km || 
|-id=343 bgcolor=#d6d6d6
| 585343 ||  || — || September 5, 2010 || Mount Lemmon || Mount Lemmon Survey ||  || align=right | 3.5 km || 
|-id=344 bgcolor=#E9E9E9
| 585344 ||  || — || September 6, 2012 || Siding Spring || SSS ||  || align=right | 3.5 km || 
|-id=345 bgcolor=#d6d6d6
| 585345 ||  || — || January 15, 2018 || Haleakala || Pan-STARRS ||  || align=right | 2.1 km || 
|-id=346 bgcolor=#d6d6d6
| 585346 ||  || — || December 25, 2006 || Kitt Peak || Spacewatch ||  || align=right | 2.2 km || 
|-id=347 bgcolor=#d6d6d6
| 585347 ||  || — || January 14, 2018 || Mount Lemmon || Mount Lemmon Survey ||  || align=right | 2.8 km || 
|-id=348 bgcolor=#E9E9E9
| 585348 ||  || — || April 2, 2006 || Mount Lemmon || Mount Lemmon Survey ||  || align=right | 1.5 km || 
|-id=349 bgcolor=#E9E9E9
| 585349 ||  || — || September 24, 2016 || Oukaimeden || C. Rinner, L. Blind ||  || align=right | 2.5 km || 
|-id=350 bgcolor=#d6d6d6
| 585350 ||  || — || January 21, 2013 || Mount Lemmon || Mount Lemmon Survey ||  || align=right | 2.2 km || 
|-id=351 bgcolor=#E9E9E9
| 585351 ||  || — || October 18, 2003 || Kitt Peak || Spacewatch ||  || align=right | 1.5 km || 
|-id=352 bgcolor=#E9E9E9
| 585352 ||  || — || February 26, 2014 || Mount Lemmon || Mount Lemmon Survey ||  || align=right | 1.7 km || 
|-id=353 bgcolor=#d6d6d6
| 585353 ||  || — || March 31, 2003 || Apache Point || SDSS Collaboration ||  || align=right | 3.1 km || 
|-id=354 bgcolor=#d6d6d6
| 585354 ||  || — || June 1, 2003 || Cerro Tololo || M. W. Buie, K. J. Meech ||  || align=right | 2.7 km || 
|-id=355 bgcolor=#d6d6d6
| 585355 ||  || — || June 15, 2015 || Haleakala || Pan-STARRS ||  || align=right | 2.7 km || 
|-id=356 bgcolor=#fefefe
| 585356 ||  || — || October 1, 2005 || Kitt Peak || Spacewatch ||  || align=right data-sort-value="0.79" | 790 m || 
|-id=357 bgcolor=#d6d6d6
| 585357 ||  || — || January 4, 2001 || Haleakala || AMOS ||  || align=right | 3.8 km || 
|-id=358 bgcolor=#d6d6d6
| 585358 ||  || — || January 27, 2007 || Mount Lemmon || Mount Lemmon Survey ||  || align=right | 2.8 km || 
|-id=359 bgcolor=#fefefe
| 585359 ||  || — || March 17, 2004 || Kitt Peak || Spacewatch ||  || align=right data-sort-value="0.54" | 540 m || 
|-id=360 bgcolor=#E9E9E9
| 585360 ||  || — || February 1, 2005 || Kitt Peak || Spacewatch ||  || align=right | 1.4 km || 
|-id=361 bgcolor=#d6d6d6
| 585361 ||  || — || November 18, 2011 || Mount Lemmon || Mount Lemmon Survey ||  || align=right | 3.3 km || 
|-id=362 bgcolor=#d6d6d6
| 585362 ||  || — || November 22, 2006 || Mount Lemmon || Mount Lemmon Survey ||  || align=right | 3.2 km || 
|-id=363 bgcolor=#E9E9E9
| 585363 ||  || — || December 11, 2012 || Catalina || CSS ||  || align=right | 2.2 km || 
|-id=364 bgcolor=#fefefe
| 585364 ||  || — || February 13, 2008 || Catalina || CSS ||  || align=right data-sort-value="0.59" | 590 m || 
|-id=365 bgcolor=#d6d6d6
| 585365 ||  || — || December 25, 2011 || Mount Lemmon || Mount Lemmon Survey ||  || align=right | 2.8 km || 
|-id=366 bgcolor=#E9E9E9
| 585366 ||  || — || February 12, 2004 || Kitt Peak || Spacewatch ||  || align=right | 1.9 km || 
|-id=367 bgcolor=#E9E9E9
| 585367 ||  || — || February 11, 2004 || Palomar || NEAT ||  || align=right | 2.4 km || 
|-id=368 bgcolor=#fefefe
| 585368 ||  || — || November 11, 2009 || Mount Lemmon || Mount Lemmon Survey ||  || align=right data-sort-value="0.78" | 780 m || 
|-id=369 bgcolor=#E9E9E9
| 585369 ||  || — || October 21, 2016 || Mount Lemmon || Mount Lemmon Survey ||  || align=right | 2.2 km || 
|-id=370 bgcolor=#d6d6d6
| 585370 ||  || — || February 6, 2013 || Kitt Peak || Spacewatch ||  || align=right | 2.6 km || 
|-id=371 bgcolor=#d6d6d6
| 585371 ||  || — || August 16, 2009 || Kitt Peak || Spacewatch ||  || align=right | 3.5 km || 
|-id=372 bgcolor=#FA8072
| 585372 ||  || — || June 26, 2014 || Haleakala || Pan-STARRS ||  || align=right data-sort-value="0.46" | 460 m || 
|-id=373 bgcolor=#d6d6d6
| 585373 ||  || — || January 25, 2012 || Haleakala || Pan-STARRS ||  || align=right | 2.5 km || 
|-id=374 bgcolor=#E9E9E9
| 585374 ||  || — || March 12, 2014 || Haleakala || Pan-STARRS ||  || align=right | 1.6 km || 
|-id=375 bgcolor=#d6d6d6
| 585375 ||  || — || February 17, 2018 || Mount Lemmon || Mount Lemmon Survey ||  || align=right | 2.5 km || 
|-id=376 bgcolor=#fefefe
| 585376 ||  || — || March 15, 2013 || Palomar || PTF || H || align=right data-sort-value="0.62" | 620 m || 
|-id=377 bgcolor=#fefefe
| 585377 ||  || — || May 10, 2003 || Kitt Peak || Spacewatch || H || align=right data-sort-value="0.68" | 680 m || 
|-id=378 bgcolor=#fefefe
| 585378 ||  || — || June 19, 2004 || Kitt Peak || Spacewatch ||  || align=right data-sort-value="0.82" | 820 m || 
|-id=379 bgcolor=#fefefe
| 585379 ||  || — || April 13, 2005 || Catalina || CSS ||  || align=right data-sort-value="0.83" | 830 m || 
|-id=380 bgcolor=#fefefe
| 585380 ||  || — || December 25, 2013 || Mount Lemmon || Mount Lemmon Survey ||  || align=right data-sort-value="0.63" | 630 m || 
|-id=381 bgcolor=#C2FFFF
| 585381 ||  || — || August 10, 2012 || Kitt Peak || Spacewatch || L5 || align=right | 9.0 km || 
|-id=382 bgcolor=#fefefe
| 585382 ||  || — || October 25, 2005 || Kitt Peak || Spacewatch ||  || align=right data-sort-value="0.78" | 780 m || 
|-id=383 bgcolor=#fefefe
| 585383 ||  || — || March 17, 2015 || Haleakala || Pan-STARRS ||  || align=right data-sort-value="0.71" | 710 m || 
|-id=384 bgcolor=#E9E9E9
| 585384 ||  || — || May 9, 2014 || Kitt Peak || Spacewatch ||  || align=right | 1.5 km || 
|-id=385 bgcolor=#fefefe
| 585385 ||  || — || September 28, 2008 || Mount Lemmon || Mount Lemmon Survey ||  || align=right data-sort-value="0.65" | 650 m || 
|-id=386 bgcolor=#E9E9E9
| 585386 ||  || — || September 23, 2011 || Haleakala || Pan-STARRS ||  || align=right | 1.6 km || 
|-id=387 bgcolor=#fefefe
| 585387 ||  || — || April 23, 2015 || Haleakala || Pan-STARRS 2 ||  || align=right data-sort-value="0.57" | 570 m || 
|-id=388 bgcolor=#E9E9E9
| 585388 ||  || — || October 20, 2011 || Mount Lemmon || Mount Lemmon Survey ||  || align=right | 1.6 km || 
|-id=389 bgcolor=#d6d6d6
| 585389 ||  || — || April 13, 2013 || Haleakala || Pan-STARRS ||  || align=right | 2.2 km || 
|-id=390 bgcolor=#fefefe
| 585390 ||  || — || March 10, 2007 || Mount Lemmon || Mount Lemmon Survey ||  || align=right data-sort-value="0.71" | 710 m || 
|-id=391 bgcolor=#d6d6d6
| 585391 ||  || — || May 8, 2013 || Haleakala || Pan-STARRS ||  || align=right | 2.7 km || 
|-id=392 bgcolor=#C2FFFF
| 585392 ||  || — || March 17, 2018 || Haleakala || Pan-STARRS || L5 || align=right | 5.8 km || 
|-id=393 bgcolor=#fefefe
| 585393 ||  || — || December 15, 2001 || Socorro || LINEAR || H || align=right data-sort-value="0.67" | 670 m || 
|-id=394 bgcolor=#fefefe
| 585394 ||  || — || August 19, 2016 || Haleakala || Pan-STARRS || H || align=right data-sort-value="0.51" | 510 m || 
|-id=395 bgcolor=#fefefe
| 585395 ||  || — || April 30, 2013 || Palomar || PTF || H || align=right data-sort-value="0.54" | 540 m || 
|-id=396 bgcolor=#E9E9E9
| 585396 ||  || — || February 27, 2014 || Mount Lemmon || Mount Lemmon Survey ||  || align=right data-sort-value="0.94" | 940 m || 
|-id=397 bgcolor=#E9E9E9
| 585397 ||  || — || September 21, 2011 || Kitt Peak || Spacewatch ||  || align=right | 2.3 km || 
|-id=398 bgcolor=#d6d6d6
| 585398 ||  || — || December 23, 2016 || Haleakala || Pan-STARRS ||  || align=right | 3.4 km || 
|-id=399 bgcolor=#d6d6d6
| 585399 ||  || — || February 23, 2012 || Mount Lemmon || Mount Lemmon Survey ||  || align=right | 2.2 km || 
|-id=400 bgcolor=#d6d6d6
| 585400 ||  || — || March 13, 2012 || Mount Lemmon || Mount Lemmon Survey ||  || align=right | 2.4 km || 
|}

585401–585500 

|-bgcolor=#fefefe
| 585401 ||  || — || September 13, 2005 || Kitt Peak || Spacewatch ||  || align=right data-sort-value="0.82" | 820 m || 
|-id=402 bgcolor=#fefefe
| 585402 ||  || — || February 11, 2004 || Palomar || NEAT ||  || align=right data-sort-value="0.68" | 680 m || 
|-id=403 bgcolor=#E9E9E9
| 585403 ||  || — || September 30, 2011 || Kitt Peak || Spacewatch ||  || align=right | 2.1 km || 
|-id=404 bgcolor=#E9E9E9
| 585404 ||  || — || September 15, 2007 || Kitt Peak || Spacewatch ||  || align=right data-sort-value="0.86" | 860 m || 
|-id=405 bgcolor=#d6d6d6
| 585405 ||  || — || August 23, 2014 || Haleakala || Pan-STARRS ||  || align=right | 2.1 km || 
|-id=406 bgcolor=#FA8072
| 585406 ||  || — || August 4, 2016 || Haleakala || Pan-STARRS || H || align=right data-sort-value="0.49" | 490 m || 
|-id=407 bgcolor=#fefefe
| 585407 ||  || — || January 16, 2015 || Mount Lemmon || Mount Lemmon Survey || H || align=right data-sort-value="0.65" | 650 m || 
|-id=408 bgcolor=#d6d6d6
| 585408 ||  || — || June 4, 2013 || Haleakala || Pan-STARRS ||  || align=right | 3.1 km || 
|-id=409 bgcolor=#E9E9E9
| 585409 ||  || — || April 13, 2004 || Kitt Peak || Spacewatch ||  || align=right | 2.8 km || 
|-id=410 bgcolor=#E9E9E9
| 585410 ||  || — || October 28, 2006 || Kitt Peak || Spacewatch ||  || align=right | 1.7 km || 
|-id=411 bgcolor=#FA8072
| 585411 ||  || — || April 17, 2013 || Haleakala || Pan-STARRS || H || align=right data-sort-value="0.49" | 490 m || 
|-id=412 bgcolor=#fefefe
| 585412 ||  || — || May 30, 2013 || Mount Lemmon || Mount Lemmon Survey || H || align=right data-sort-value="0.67" | 670 m || 
|-id=413 bgcolor=#d6d6d6
| 585413 ||  || — || February 21, 2012 || Mount Lemmon || Mount Lemmon Survey ||  || align=right | 2.7 km || 
|-id=414 bgcolor=#E9E9E9
| 585414 ||  || — || April 5, 2005 || Palomar || NEAT ||  || align=right | 1.8 km || 
|-id=415 bgcolor=#d6d6d6
| 585415 ||  || — || September 19, 2002 || Palomar || NEAT ||  || align=right | 3.6 km || 
|-id=416 bgcolor=#fefefe
| 585416 ||  || — || January 29, 2009 || Catalina || CSS || H || align=right data-sort-value="0.82" | 820 m || 
|-id=417 bgcolor=#fefefe
| 585417 ||  || — || January 26, 2012 || Haleakala || Pan-STARRS || H || align=right data-sort-value="0.62" | 620 m || 
|-id=418 bgcolor=#fefefe
| 585418 ||  || — || February 19, 2012 || Catalina || CSS || H || align=right data-sort-value="0.82" | 820 m || 
|-id=419 bgcolor=#fefefe
| 585419 ||  || — || April 15, 2004 || Apache Point || SDSS Collaboration || H || align=right data-sort-value="0.67" | 670 m || 
|-id=420 bgcolor=#fefefe
| 585420 ||  || — || December 23, 2016 || Haleakala || Pan-STARRS || H || align=right data-sort-value="0.57" | 570 m || 
|-id=421 bgcolor=#E9E9E9
| 585421 ||  || — || February 12, 2005 || La Silla || A. Boattini ||  || align=right | 1.8 km || 
|-id=422 bgcolor=#fefefe
| 585422 ||  || — || February 18, 2015 || Haleakala || Pan-STARRS || H || align=right data-sort-value="0.58" | 580 m || 
|-id=423 bgcolor=#d6d6d6
| 585423 ||  || — || November 9, 2004 || Catalina || CSS ||  || align=right | 4.4 km || 
|-id=424 bgcolor=#fefefe
| 585424 ||  || — || July 30, 2005 || Palomar || NEAT ||  || align=right data-sort-value="0.58" | 580 m || 
|-id=425 bgcolor=#fefefe
| 585425 ||  || — || March 31, 2014 || Mount Lemmon || Mount Lemmon Survey ||  || align=right data-sort-value="0.71" | 710 m || 
|-id=426 bgcolor=#E9E9E9
| 585426 ||  || — || April 30, 2009 || Kitt Peak || Spacewatch ||  || align=right | 2.1 km || 
|-id=427 bgcolor=#d6d6d6
| 585427 ||  || — || December 6, 2008 || Kitt Peak || Spacewatch ||  || align=right | 2.9 km || 
|-id=428 bgcolor=#FFC2E0
| 585428 ||  || — || July 9, 2018 || Haleakala || Pan-STARRS || APO || align=right data-sort-value="0.23" | 230 m || 
|-id=429 bgcolor=#E9E9E9
| 585429 ||  || — || June 13, 2010 || Mount Lemmon || Mount Lemmon Survey ||  || align=right | 1.2 km || 
|-id=430 bgcolor=#fefefe
| 585430 ||  || — || April 23, 2015 || Haleakala || Pan-STARRS || H || align=right data-sort-value="0.51" | 510 m || 
|-id=431 bgcolor=#fefefe
| 585431 ||  || — || July 3, 2011 || Mount Lemmon || Mount Lemmon Survey ||  || align=right data-sort-value="0.74" | 740 m || 
|-id=432 bgcolor=#E9E9E9
| 585432 ||  || — || November 2, 2010 || Mount Lemmon || Mount Lemmon Survey ||  || align=right | 1.6 km || 
|-id=433 bgcolor=#d6d6d6
| 585433 ||  || — || November 8, 2008 || Kitt Peak || Spacewatch ||  || align=right | 2.9 km || 
|-id=434 bgcolor=#C2FFFF
| 585434 ||  || — || July 12, 2018 || Haleakala || Pan-STARRS || L4 || align=right | 8.2 km || 
|-id=435 bgcolor=#C2FFFF
| 585435 ||  || — || July 12, 2018 || Haleakala || Pan-STARRS || L4 || align=right | 6.3 km || 
|-id=436 bgcolor=#fefefe
| 585436 ||  || — || April 3, 2011 || Haleakala || Pan-STARRS ||  || align=right data-sort-value="0.53" | 530 m || 
|-id=437 bgcolor=#fefefe
| 585437 ||  || — || February 15, 2013 || Haleakala || Pan-STARRS ||  || align=right data-sort-value="0.65" | 650 m || 
|-id=438 bgcolor=#d6d6d6
| 585438 ||  || — || February 5, 2016 || Haleakala || Pan-STARRS ||  || align=right | 2.5 km || 
|-id=439 bgcolor=#d6d6d6
| 585439 ||  || — || September 11, 2007 || Kitt Peak || Spacewatch ||  || align=right | 2.5 km || 
|-id=440 bgcolor=#d6d6d6
| 585440 ||  || — || June 23, 2017 || Haleakala || Pan-STARRS ||  || align=right | 2.4 km || 
|-id=441 bgcolor=#d6d6d6
| 585441 ||  || — || December 29, 2014 || Haleakala || Pan-STARRS ||  || align=right | 2.3 km || 
|-id=442 bgcolor=#FA8072
| 585442 ||  || — || May 27, 2011 || Nogales || M. Schwartz, P. R. Holvorcem ||  || align=right data-sort-value="0.73" | 730 m || 
|-id=443 bgcolor=#fefefe
| 585443 ||  || — || August 30, 2005 || Anderson Mesa || LONEOS ||  || align=right data-sort-value="0.66" | 660 m || 
|-id=444 bgcolor=#fefefe
| 585444 ||  || — || April 14, 2007 || Mount Lemmon || Mount Lemmon Survey ||  || align=right data-sort-value="0.69" | 690 m || 
|-id=445 bgcolor=#fefefe
| 585445 ||  || — || June 21, 2011 || Nogales || M. Schwartz, P. R. Holvorcem ||  || align=right data-sort-value="0.69" | 690 m || 
|-id=446 bgcolor=#fefefe
| 585446 ||  || — || February 14, 2010 || Kitt Peak || Spacewatch ||  || align=right data-sort-value="0.90" | 900 m || 
|-id=447 bgcolor=#fefefe
| 585447 ||  || — || September 22, 2008 || Mount Lemmon || Mount Lemmon Survey ||  || align=right data-sort-value="0.66" | 660 m || 
|-id=448 bgcolor=#fefefe
| 585448 ||  || — || November 26, 2003 || Kitt Peak || Spacewatch ||  || align=right data-sort-value="0.81" | 810 m || 
|-id=449 bgcolor=#fefefe
| 585449 ||  || — || October 1, 2011 || Kitt Peak || Spacewatch ||  || align=right data-sort-value="0.76" | 760 m || 
|-id=450 bgcolor=#d6d6d6
| 585450 ||  || — || January 19, 2016 || Haleakala || Pan-STARRS ||  || align=right | 3.0 km || 
|-id=451 bgcolor=#fefefe
| 585451 ||  || — || October 19, 2011 || Mount Lemmon || Mount Lemmon Survey ||  || align=right data-sort-value="0.82" | 820 m || 
|-id=452 bgcolor=#fefefe
| 585452 ||  || — || February 11, 2008 || Mount Lemmon || Mount Lemmon Survey ||  || align=right data-sort-value="0.96" | 960 m || 
|-id=453 bgcolor=#fefefe
| 585453 ||  || — || August 30, 2005 || Kitt Peak || Spacewatch ||  || align=right data-sort-value="0.59" | 590 m || 
|-id=454 bgcolor=#fefefe
| 585454 ||  || — || December 23, 2012 || Haleakala || Pan-STARRS ||  || align=right data-sort-value="0.67" | 670 m || 
|-id=455 bgcolor=#fefefe
| 585455 ||  || — || September 2, 2008 || Kitt Peak || Spacewatch ||  || align=right data-sort-value="0.95" | 950 m || 
|-id=456 bgcolor=#E9E9E9
| 585456 ||  || — || October 4, 1996 || Kitt Peak || Spacewatch ||  || align=right | 1.4 km || 
|-id=457 bgcolor=#fefefe
| 585457 ||  || — || November 1, 2011 || Mount Lemmon || Mount Lemmon Survey ||  || align=right data-sort-value="0.86" | 860 m || 
|-id=458 bgcolor=#fefefe
| 585458 ||  || — || September 13, 2007 || Mount Lemmon || Mount Lemmon Survey ||  || align=right data-sort-value="0.78" | 780 m || 
|-id=459 bgcolor=#fefefe
| 585459 ||  || — || November 29, 2005 || Kitt Peak || Spacewatch ||  || align=right data-sort-value="0.67" | 670 m || 
|-id=460 bgcolor=#FA8072
| 585460 ||  || — || April 14, 2008 || Kitt Peak || Spacewatch ||  || align=right data-sort-value="0.62" | 620 m || 
|-id=461 bgcolor=#fefefe
| 585461 ||  || — || February 27, 2006 || Kitt Peak || Spacewatch ||  || align=right data-sort-value="0.88" | 880 m || 
|-id=462 bgcolor=#d6d6d6
| 585462 ||  || — || September 22, 2008 || Mount Lemmon || Mount Lemmon Survey ||  || align=right | 2.1 km || 
|-id=463 bgcolor=#fefefe
| 585463 ||  || — || October 24, 2011 || Kitt Peak || Spacewatch ||  || align=right data-sort-value="0.79" | 790 m || 
|-id=464 bgcolor=#fefefe
| 585464 ||  || — || October 12, 2005 || Kitt Peak || Spacewatch ||  || align=right data-sort-value="0.85" | 850 m || 
|-id=465 bgcolor=#fefefe
| 585465 ||  || — || September 23, 2011 || Haleakala || Pan-STARRS ||  || align=right data-sort-value="0.71" | 710 m || 
|-id=466 bgcolor=#fefefe
| 585466 ||  || — || September 12, 2018 || Mount Lemmon || Mount Lemmon Survey ||  || align=right data-sort-value="0.63" | 630 m || 
|-id=467 bgcolor=#fefefe
| 585467 ||  || — || October 23, 2008 || Kitt Peak || Spacewatch ||  || align=right data-sort-value="0.63" | 630 m || 
|-id=468 bgcolor=#d6d6d6
| 585468 ||  || — || January 2, 2014 || Catalina || CSS ||  || align=right | 2.7 km || 
|-id=469 bgcolor=#fefefe
| 585469 ||  || — || January 15, 2010 || Mount Lemmon || Mount Lemmon Survey ||  || align=right data-sort-value="0.94" | 940 m || 
|-id=470 bgcolor=#fefefe
| 585470 ||  || — || October 10, 2005 || Anderson Mesa || LONEOS || H || align=right data-sort-value="0.69" | 690 m || 
|-id=471 bgcolor=#d6d6d6
| 585471 ||  || — || September 14, 2013 || Haleakala || Pan-STARRS ||  || align=right | 3.1 km || 
|-id=472 bgcolor=#E9E9E9
| 585472 ||  || — || January 12, 2011 || Kitt Peak || Spacewatch ||  || align=right | 2.3 km || 
|-id=473 bgcolor=#fefefe
| 585473 ||  || — || November 19, 2008 || Kitt Peak || Spacewatch ||  || align=right data-sort-value="0.90" | 900 m || 
|-id=474 bgcolor=#fefefe
| 585474 ||  || — || July 28, 2014 || Haleakala || Pan-STARRS ||  || align=right data-sort-value="0.86" | 860 m || 
|-id=475 bgcolor=#fefefe
| 585475 ||  || — || May 8, 2014 || Haleakala || Pan-STARRS ||  || align=right data-sort-value="0.62" | 620 m || 
|-id=476 bgcolor=#fefefe
| 585476 ||  || — || January 19, 2013 || Kitt Peak || Spacewatch ||  || align=right data-sort-value="0.67" | 670 m || 
|-id=477 bgcolor=#fefefe
| 585477 ||  || — || October 28, 2011 || Kitt Peak || Spacewatch ||  || align=right data-sort-value="0.79" | 790 m || 
|-id=478 bgcolor=#fefefe
| 585478 ||  || — || December 30, 2013 || Mount Lemmon || Mount Lemmon Survey || H || align=right data-sort-value="0.73" | 730 m || 
|-id=479 bgcolor=#d6d6d6
| 585479 ||  || — || December 4, 2008 || Mount Lemmon || Mount Lemmon Survey ||  || align=right | 3.2 km || 
|-id=480 bgcolor=#fefefe
| 585480 ||  || — || November 3, 2007 || Kitt Peak || Spacewatch ||  || align=right data-sort-value="0.73" | 730 m || 
|-id=481 bgcolor=#fefefe
| 585481 ||  || — || July 29, 2005 || Palomar || NEAT ||  || align=right data-sort-value="0.59" | 590 m || 
|-id=482 bgcolor=#fefefe
| 585482 ||  || — || August 28, 2011 || Haleakala || Pan-STARRS ||  || align=right data-sort-value="0.52" | 520 m || 
|-id=483 bgcolor=#E9E9E9
| 585483 ||  || — || December 2, 2005 || Kitt Peak || Spacewatch ||  || align=right | 1.9 km || 
|-id=484 bgcolor=#d6d6d6
| 585484 ||  || — || October 2, 2013 || Haleakala || Pan-STARRS ||  || align=right | 1.6 km || 
|-id=485 bgcolor=#fefefe
| 585485 ||  || — || April 27, 2006 || Cerro Tololo || Cerro Tololo Obs. ||  || align=right data-sort-value="0.56" | 560 m || 
|-id=486 bgcolor=#fefefe
| 585486 ||  || — || August 27, 2011 || Haleakala || Pan-STARRS ||  || align=right data-sort-value="0.65" | 650 m || 
|-id=487 bgcolor=#fefefe
| 585487 ||  || — || September 6, 2008 || Catalina || CSS ||  || align=right data-sort-value="0.65" | 650 m || 
|-id=488 bgcolor=#fefefe
| 585488 ||  || — || September 23, 2011 || Kitt Peak || Spacewatch ||  || align=right data-sort-value="0.69" | 690 m || 
|-id=489 bgcolor=#fefefe
| 585489 ||  || — || January 1, 2009 || Mount Lemmon || Mount Lemmon Survey ||  || align=right data-sort-value="0.62" | 620 m || 
|-id=490 bgcolor=#fefefe
| 585490 ||  || — || September 10, 2007 || Kitt Peak || Spacewatch ||  || align=right data-sort-value="0.82" | 820 m || 
|-id=491 bgcolor=#fefefe
| 585491 ||  || — || September 23, 2005 || Catalina || CSS ||  || align=right data-sort-value="0.82" | 820 m || 
|-id=492 bgcolor=#E9E9E9
| 585492 ||  || — || March 6, 2008 || Mount Lemmon || Mount Lemmon Survey ||  || align=right data-sort-value="0.94" | 940 m || 
|-id=493 bgcolor=#fefefe
| 585493 ||  || — || January 10, 2003 || Kitt Peak || Spacewatch ||  || align=right data-sort-value="0.77" | 770 m || 
|-id=494 bgcolor=#fefefe
| 585494 ||  || — || November 24, 2011 || Mount Lemmon || Mount Lemmon Survey ||  || align=right data-sort-value="0.79" | 790 m || 
|-id=495 bgcolor=#fefefe
| 585495 ||  || — || September 19, 2008 || Kitt Peak || Spacewatch ||  || align=right data-sort-value="0.78" | 780 m || 
|-id=496 bgcolor=#fefefe
| 585496 ||  || — || July 26, 2008 || Siding Spring || SSS ||  || align=right data-sort-value="0.97" | 970 m || 
|-id=497 bgcolor=#E9E9E9
| 585497 ||  || — || October 31, 2010 || Mount Lemmon || Mount Lemmon Survey ||  || align=right | 1.1 km || 
|-id=498 bgcolor=#fefefe
| 585498 ||  || — || October 3, 2011 || XuYi || PMO NEO ||  || align=right data-sort-value="0.79" | 790 m || 
|-id=499 bgcolor=#E9E9E9
| 585499 ||  || — || October 24, 2014 || Mount Lemmon || Mount Lemmon Survey ||  || align=right | 1.3 km || 
|-id=500 bgcolor=#fefefe
| 585500 ||  || — || September 6, 2008 || Kitt Peak || Spacewatch ||  || align=right data-sort-value="0.76" | 760 m || 
|}

585501–585600 

|-bgcolor=#fefefe
| 585501 ||  || — || September 6, 2008 || Mount Lemmon || Mount Lemmon Survey ||  || align=right data-sort-value="0.50" | 500 m || 
|-id=502 bgcolor=#fefefe
| 585502 ||  || — || September 10, 2007 || Mount Lemmon || Mount Lemmon Survey ||  || align=right data-sort-value="0.66" | 660 m || 
|-id=503 bgcolor=#fefefe
| 585503 ||  || — || November 30, 2011 || Charleston || R. Holmes ||  || align=right data-sort-value="0.60" | 600 m || 
|-id=504 bgcolor=#fefefe
| 585504 ||  || — || December 1, 2008 || Kitt Peak || Spacewatch ||  || align=right data-sort-value="0.53" | 530 m || 
|-id=505 bgcolor=#fefefe
| 585505 ||  || — || September 23, 2014 || Haleakala || Pan-STARRS ||  || align=right data-sort-value="0.77" | 770 m || 
|-id=506 bgcolor=#fefefe
| 585506 ||  || — || December 28, 2005 || Mount Lemmon || Mount Lemmon Survey ||  || align=right data-sort-value="0.56" | 560 m || 
|-id=507 bgcolor=#fefefe
| 585507 ||  || — || September 15, 2007 || Anderson Mesa || LONEOS ||  || align=right data-sort-value="0.66" | 660 m || 
|-id=508 bgcolor=#fefefe
| 585508 ||  || — || July 27, 2011 || Haleakala || Pan-STARRS ||  || align=right data-sort-value="0.54" | 540 m || 
|-id=509 bgcolor=#E9E9E9
| 585509 ||  || — || October 26, 2009 || Kitt Peak || Spacewatch ||  || align=right | 1.9 km || 
|-id=510 bgcolor=#fefefe
| 585510 ||  || — || October 23, 2011 || Mount Lemmon || Mount Lemmon Survey ||  || align=right data-sort-value="0.63" | 630 m || 
|-id=511 bgcolor=#fefefe
| 585511 ||  || — || April 4, 2010 || Kitt Peak || Spacewatch ||  || align=right data-sort-value="0.91" | 910 m || 
|-id=512 bgcolor=#fefefe
| 585512 ||  || — || October 12, 2007 || Anderson Mesa || LONEOS ||  || align=right data-sort-value="0.63" | 630 m || 
|-id=513 bgcolor=#E9E9E9
| 585513 ||  || — || October 25, 2000 || Socorro || LINEAR ||  || align=right | 2.3 km || 
|-id=514 bgcolor=#fefefe
| 585514 ||  || — || October 20, 2003 || Kitt Peak || Spacewatch ||  || align=right data-sort-value="0.90" | 900 m || 
|-id=515 bgcolor=#E9E9E9
| 585515 ||  || — || June 9, 2013 || Haleakala || Pan-STARRS ||  || align=right | 1.2 km || 
|-id=516 bgcolor=#fefefe
| 585516 ||  || — || October 5, 2010 || La Sagra || OAM Obs. || H || align=right data-sort-value="0.56" | 560 m || 
|-id=517 bgcolor=#fefefe
| 585517 ||  || — || October 25, 2005 || Kitt Peak || Spacewatch ||  || align=right data-sort-value="0.80" | 800 m || 
|-id=518 bgcolor=#d6d6d6
| 585518 ||  || — || August 23, 2003 || Palomar || NEAT ||  || align=right | 2.2 km || 
|-id=519 bgcolor=#E9E9E9
| 585519 ||  || — || December 30, 2005 || Kitt Peak || Spacewatch ||  || align=right | 1.6 km || 
|-id=520 bgcolor=#fefefe
| 585520 ||  || — || January 30, 2012 || Mount Lemmon || Mount Lemmon Survey ||  || align=right data-sort-value="0.83" | 830 m || 
|-id=521 bgcolor=#d6d6d6
| 585521 ||  || — || January 7, 2014 || Mount Lemmon || Mount Lemmon Survey ||  || align=right | 3.5 km || 
|-id=522 bgcolor=#E9E9E9
| 585522 ||  || — || November 23, 2014 || Haleakala || Pan-STARRS ||  || align=right | 1.7 km || 
|-id=523 bgcolor=#fefefe
| 585523 ||  || — || July 28, 2014 || Haleakala || Pan-STARRS ||  || align=right data-sort-value="0.79" | 790 m || 
|-id=524 bgcolor=#E9E9E9
| 585524 ||  || — || December 9, 2010 || Mount Lemmon || Mount Lemmon Survey ||  || align=right | 1.2 km || 
|-id=525 bgcolor=#fefefe
| 585525 ||  || — || September 29, 2008 || Catalina || CSS ||  || align=right data-sort-value="0.68" | 680 m || 
|-id=526 bgcolor=#d6d6d6
| 585526 ||  || — || September 14, 2013 || Haleakala || Pan-STARRS ||  || align=right | 3.4 km || 
|-id=527 bgcolor=#fefefe
| 585527 ||  || — || January 6, 2013 || Kitt Peak || Spacewatch ||  || align=right data-sort-value="0.58" | 580 m || 
|-id=528 bgcolor=#fefefe
| 585528 ||  || — || October 27, 2008 || Mount Lemmon || Mount Lemmon Survey ||  || align=right data-sort-value="0.74" | 740 m || 
|-id=529 bgcolor=#E9E9E9
| 585529 ||  || — || March 2, 2011 || Kitt Peak || Spacewatch ||  || align=right | 2.3 km || 
|-id=530 bgcolor=#E9E9E9
| 585530 ||  || — || September 10, 2013 || Haleakala || Pan-STARRS ||  || align=right | 2.4 km || 
|-id=531 bgcolor=#fefefe
| 585531 ||  || — || October 18, 2011 || Kitt Peak || Spacewatch ||  || align=right data-sort-value="0.75" | 750 m || 
|-id=532 bgcolor=#fefefe
| 585532 ||  || — || January 6, 2013 || Mount Lemmon || Mount Lemmon Survey ||  || align=right data-sort-value="0.92" | 920 m || 
|-id=533 bgcolor=#fefefe
| 585533 ||  || — || February 3, 2008 || Mount Lemmon || Mount Lemmon Survey || H || align=right data-sort-value="0.58" | 580 m || 
|-id=534 bgcolor=#fefefe
| 585534 ||  || — || October 2, 2005 || Palomar || NEAT ||  || align=right data-sort-value="0.66" | 660 m || 
|-id=535 bgcolor=#d6d6d6
| 585535 ||  || — || November 19, 2008 || Kitt Peak || Spacewatch ||  || align=right | 2.7 km || 
|-id=536 bgcolor=#E9E9E9
| 585536 ||  || — || February 25, 2006 || Mount Lemmon || Mount Lemmon Survey ||  || align=right | 2.1 km || 
|-id=537 bgcolor=#fefefe
| 585537 ||  || — || September 23, 2011 || Haleakala || Pan-STARRS ||  || align=right data-sort-value="0.67" | 670 m || 
|-id=538 bgcolor=#fefefe
| 585538 ||  || — || August 25, 2014 || Haleakala || Pan-STARRS ||  || align=right data-sort-value="0.69" | 690 m || 
|-id=539 bgcolor=#E9E9E9
| 585539 ||  || — || October 27, 2005 || Kitt Peak || Spacewatch ||  || align=right | 1.3 km || 
|-id=540 bgcolor=#fefefe
| 585540 ||  || — || June 18, 2005 || Mount Lemmon || Mount Lemmon Survey ||  || align=right data-sort-value="0.48" | 480 m || 
|-id=541 bgcolor=#d6d6d6
| 585541 ||  || — || November 27, 2013 || Haleakala || Pan-STARRS ||  || align=right | 2.1 km || 
|-id=542 bgcolor=#E9E9E9
| 585542 ||  || — || September 25, 2009 || Kitt Peak || Spacewatch ||  || align=right | 1.3 km || 
|-id=543 bgcolor=#d6d6d6
| 585543 ||  || — || November 28, 2013 || Mount Lemmon || Mount Lemmon Survey ||  || align=right | 2.9 km || 
|-id=544 bgcolor=#E9E9E9
| 585544 ||  || — || November 24, 2006 || Kitt Peak || Spacewatch ||  || align=right data-sort-value="0.92" | 920 m || 
|-id=545 bgcolor=#d6d6d6
| 585545 ||  || — || November 27, 2013 || Haleakala || Pan-STARRS ||  || align=right | 2.4 km || 
|-id=546 bgcolor=#fefefe
| 585546 ||  || — || September 18, 2011 || Mount Lemmon || Mount Lemmon Survey ||  || align=right data-sort-value="0.47" | 470 m || 
|-id=547 bgcolor=#fefefe
| 585547 ||  || — || September 27, 2011 || Mount Lemmon || Mount Lemmon Survey ||  || align=right data-sort-value="0.88" | 880 m || 
|-id=548 bgcolor=#d6d6d6
| 585548 ||  || — || September 13, 2007 || Mount Lemmon || Mount Lemmon Survey ||  || align=right | 2.7 km || 
|-id=549 bgcolor=#E9E9E9
| 585549 ||  || — || November 1, 2005 || Kitt Peak || Spacewatch ||  || align=right | 1.2 km || 
|-id=550 bgcolor=#fefefe
| 585550 ||  || — || September 26, 2011 || Haleakala || Pan-STARRS ||  || align=right data-sort-value="0.57" | 570 m || 
|-id=551 bgcolor=#d6d6d6
| 585551 ||  || — || July 26, 2017 || Haleakala || Pan-STARRS ||  || align=right | 1.8 km || 
|-id=552 bgcolor=#d6d6d6
| 585552 ||  || — || August 23, 2017 || Haleakala || Pan-STARRS ||  || align=right | 2.2 km || 
|-id=553 bgcolor=#E9E9E9
| 585553 ||  || — || January 28, 2011 || Mount Lemmon || Mount Lemmon Survey ||  || align=right | 2.2 km || 
|-id=554 bgcolor=#d6d6d6
| 585554 ||  || — || September 14, 2007 || Mount Lemmon || Mount Lemmon Survey ||  || align=right | 2.3 km || 
|-id=555 bgcolor=#fefefe
| 585555 ||  || — || December 16, 1993 || Kitt Peak || Spacewatch ||  || align=right data-sort-value="0.69" | 690 m || 
|-id=556 bgcolor=#fefefe
| 585556 ||  || — || October 24, 2011 || Haleakala || Pan-STARRS ||  || align=right data-sort-value="0.68" | 680 m || 
|-id=557 bgcolor=#fefefe
| 585557 ||  || — || September 13, 2007 || Mount Lemmon || Mount Lemmon Survey ||  || align=right data-sort-value="0.64" | 640 m || 
|-id=558 bgcolor=#E9E9E9
| 585558 ||  || — || September 16, 2009 || Kitt Peak || Spacewatch ||  || align=right | 2.1 km || 
|-id=559 bgcolor=#fefefe
| 585559 ||  || — || November 17, 2008 || Kitt Peak || Spacewatch ||  || align=right data-sort-value="0.54" | 540 m || 
|-id=560 bgcolor=#fefefe
| 585560 ||  || — || November 18, 2011 || Kitt Peak || Spacewatch ||  || align=right data-sort-value="0.71" | 710 m || 
|-id=561 bgcolor=#d6d6d6
| 585561 ||  || — || September 7, 2008 || Mount Lemmon || Mount Lemmon Survey ||  || align=right | 1.8 km || 
|-id=562 bgcolor=#fefefe
| 585562 ||  || — || October 25, 2011 || Haleakala || Pan-STARRS ||  || align=right data-sort-value="0.78" | 780 m || 
|-id=563 bgcolor=#fefefe
| 585563 ||  || — || December 20, 2007 || Kitt Peak || Spacewatch ||  || align=right data-sort-value="0.66" | 660 m || 
|-id=564 bgcolor=#E9E9E9
| 585564 ||  || — || February 19, 2002 || Kitt Peak || Spacewatch ||  || align=right | 1.6 km || 
|-id=565 bgcolor=#fefefe
| 585565 ||  || — || December 21, 2011 || Palomar || PTF ||  || align=right data-sort-value="0.87" | 870 m || 
|-id=566 bgcolor=#fefefe
| 585566 ||  || — || October 25, 2011 || Haleakala || Pan-STARRS ||  || align=right data-sort-value="0.62" | 620 m || 
|-id=567 bgcolor=#fefefe
| 585567 ||  || — || June 4, 2014 || Haleakala || Pan-STARRS ||  || align=right data-sort-value="0.62" | 620 m || 
|-id=568 bgcolor=#E9E9E9
| 585568 ||  || — || December 13, 2014 || Haleakala || Pan-STARRS ||  || align=right data-sort-value="0.80" | 800 m || 
|-id=569 bgcolor=#fefefe
| 585569 ||  || — || January 30, 2012 || Kitt Peak || Spacewatch ||  || align=right data-sort-value="0.63" | 630 m || 
|-id=570 bgcolor=#fefefe
| 585570 ||  || — || September 1, 2014 || Catalina || CSS ||  || align=right data-sort-value="0.79" | 790 m || 
|-id=571 bgcolor=#fefefe
| 585571 ||  || — || January 15, 2009 || Kitt Peak || Spacewatch ||  || align=right data-sort-value="0.69" | 690 m || 
|-id=572 bgcolor=#E9E9E9
| 585572 ||  || — || December 8, 2010 || Palomar || PTF ||  || align=right | 1.3 km || 
|-id=573 bgcolor=#E9E9E9
| 585573 ||  || — || November 27, 2010 || Mount Lemmon || Mount Lemmon Survey ||  || align=right data-sort-value="0.90" | 900 m || 
|-id=574 bgcolor=#fefefe
| 585574 ||  || — || November 23, 2011 || Kitt Peak || Spacewatch ||  || align=right data-sort-value="0.75" | 750 m || 
|-id=575 bgcolor=#d6d6d6
| 585575 ||  || — || December 25, 2013 || Mount Lemmon || Mount Lemmon Survey ||  || align=right | 2.5 km || 
|-id=576 bgcolor=#E9E9E9
| 585576 ||  || — || January 27, 2007 || Mount Lemmon || Mount Lemmon Survey ||  || align=right data-sort-value="0.72" | 720 m || 
|-id=577 bgcolor=#d6d6d6
| 585577 ||  || — || September 16, 2003 || Kitt Peak || Spacewatch ||  || align=right | 2.4 km || 
|-id=578 bgcolor=#fefefe
| 585578 ||  || — || November 2, 2007 || Kitt Peak || Spacewatch ||  || align=right data-sort-value="0.86" | 860 m || 
|-id=579 bgcolor=#d6d6d6
| 585579 ||  || — || November 22, 2006 || Mount Lemmon || Mount Lemmon Survey || 7:4 || align=right | 2.7 km || 
|-id=580 bgcolor=#fefefe
| 585580 ||  || — || November 28, 2011 || Haleakala || Pan-STARRS ||  || align=right data-sort-value="0.90" | 900 m || 
|-id=581 bgcolor=#E9E9E9
| 585581 ||  || — || May 4, 2017 || Haleakala || Pan-STARRS ||  || align=right data-sort-value="0.98" | 980 m || 
|-id=582 bgcolor=#fefefe
| 585582 ||  || — || April 12, 2013 || Haleakala || Pan-STARRS ||  || align=right data-sort-value="0.74" | 740 m || 
|-id=583 bgcolor=#fefefe
| 585583 ||  || — || December 12, 2004 || Kitt Peak || Spacewatch ||  || align=right data-sort-value="0.56" | 560 m || 
|-id=584 bgcolor=#E9E9E9
| 585584 ||  || — || November 25, 2005 || Catalina || CSS ||  || align=right | 1.5 km || 
|-id=585 bgcolor=#E9E9E9
| 585585 ||  || — || December 13, 2006 || Mount Lemmon || Mount Lemmon Survey ||  || align=right data-sort-value="0.82" | 820 m || 
|-id=586 bgcolor=#d6d6d6
| 585586 ||  || — || February 16, 2015 || Haleakala || Pan-STARRS ||  || align=right | 2.1 km || 
|-id=587 bgcolor=#fefefe
| 585587 ||  || — || May 4, 2005 || Mauna Kea || Mauna Kea Obs. ||  || align=right data-sort-value="0.75" | 750 m || 
|-id=588 bgcolor=#E9E9E9
| 585588 ||  || — || January 16, 2015 || Haleakala || Pan-STARRS ||  || align=right | 1.5 km || 
|-id=589 bgcolor=#E9E9E9
| 585589 ||  || — || November 21, 2014 || Charleston || R. Holmes ||  || align=right | 1.1 km || 
|-id=590 bgcolor=#E9E9E9
| 585590 ||  || — || July 9, 2005 || Kitt Peak || Spacewatch ||  || align=right | 1.1 km || 
|-id=591 bgcolor=#d6d6d6
| 585591 ||  || — || October 6, 2012 || Haleakala || Pan-STARRS ||  || align=right | 2.1 km || 
|-id=592 bgcolor=#d6d6d6
| 585592 ||  || — || September 10, 2007 || Kitt Peak || Spacewatch ||  || align=right | 2.1 km || 
|-id=593 bgcolor=#fefefe
| 585593 ||  || — || October 11, 2010 || Mount Lemmon || Mount Lemmon Survey ||  || align=right data-sort-value="0.90" | 900 m || 
|-id=594 bgcolor=#fefefe
| 585594 ||  || — || October 31, 2008 || Kitt Peak || Spacewatch ||  || align=right data-sort-value="0.81" | 810 m || 
|-id=595 bgcolor=#E9E9E9
| 585595 ||  || — || November 16, 2009 || Kitt Peak || Spacewatch ||  || align=right | 2.2 km || 
|-id=596 bgcolor=#fefefe
| 585596 ||  || — || September 27, 2011 || Mount Lemmon || Mount Lemmon Survey ||  || align=right data-sort-value="0.71" | 710 m || 
|-id=597 bgcolor=#E9E9E9
| 585597 ||  || — || November 22, 2014 || Mount Lemmon || Mount Lemmon Survey ||  || align=right | 1.3 km || 
|-id=598 bgcolor=#fefefe
| 585598 ||  || — || January 11, 2008 || Kitt Peak || Spacewatch ||  || align=right data-sort-value="0.57" | 570 m || 
|-id=599 bgcolor=#fefefe
| 585599 ||  || — || December 29, 2008 || Mount Lemmon || Mount Lemmon Survey ||  || align=right data-sort-value="0.70" | 700 m || 
|-id=600 bgcolor=#fefefe
| 585600 ||  || — || May 7, 2014 || Haleakala || Pan-STARRS ||  || align=right data-sort-value="0.56" | 560 m || 
|}

585601–585700 

|-bgcolor=#fefefe
| 585601 ||  || — || November 13, 2007 || Mount Lemmon || Mount Lemmon Survey ||  || align=right data-sort-value="0.68" | 680 m || 
|-id=602 bgcolor=#E9E9E9
| 585602 ||  || — || May 30, 2012 || Mount Lemmon || Mount Lemmon Survey ||  || align=right | 1.3 km || 
|-id=603 bgcolor=#E9E9E9
| 585603 ||  || — || March 11, 2011 || Charleston || R. Holmes ||  || align=right | 1.3 km || 
|-id=604 bgcolor=#d6d6d6
| 585604 ||  || — || August 17, 2017 || Haleakala || Pan-STARRS ||  || align=right | 2.3 km || 
|-id=605 bgcolor=#E9E9E9
| 585605 ||  || — || May 21, 2017 || Haleakala || Pan-STARRS ||  || align=right | 2.0 km || 
|-id=606 bgcolor=#E9E9E9
| 585606 ||  || — || October 18, 2014 || Mount Lemmon || Mount Lemmon Survey ||  || align=right | 1.3 km || 
|-id=607 bgcolor=#d6d6d6
| 585607 ||  || — || January 16, 2009 || Mount Lemmon || Mount Lemmon Survey ||  || align=right | 3.8 km || 
|-id=608 bgcolor=#fefefe
| 585608 ||  || — || September 17, 2003 || Campo Imperatore || CINEOS ||  || align=right data-sort-value="0.89" | 890 m || 
|-id=609 bgcolor=#E9E9E9
| 585609 ||  || — || December 31, 2002 || Socorro || LINEAR ||  || align=right | 1.3 km || 
|-id=610 bgcolor=#fefefe
| 585610 ||  || — || February 4, 2005 || Catalina || CSS ||  || align=right data-sort-value="0.94" | 940 m || 
|-id=611 bgcolor=#fefefe
| 585611 ||  || — || October 7, 2010 || Catalina || CSS ||  || align=right | 1.1 km || 
|-id=612 bgcolor=#fefefe
| 585612 ||  || — || September 8, 2007 || Siding Spring || SSS ||  || align=right | 1.1 km || 
|-id=613 bgcolor=#E9E9E9
| 585613 ||  || — || December 5, 2005 || Mount Lemmon || Mount Lemmon Survey ||  || align=right | 1.5 km || 
|-id=614 bgcolor=#E9E9E9
| 585614 ||  || — || October 13, 2010 || Mount Lemmon || Mount Lemmon Survey ||  || align=right | 1.1 km || 
|-id=615 bgcolor=#E9E9E9
| 585615 ||  || — || March 31, 2003 || Cerro Tololo || Cerro Tololo Obs. ||  || align=right | 1.3 km || 
|-id=616 bgcolor=#E9E9E9
| 585616 ||  || — || November 28, 2014 || Mount Lemmon || Mount Lemmon Survey ||  || align=right | 1.8 km || 
|-id=617 bgcolor=#d6d6d6
| 585617 ||  || — || November 2, 2007 || Kitt Peak || Spacewatch ||  || align=right | 2.3 km || 
|-id=618 bgcolor=#E9E9E9
| 585618 ||  || — || October 26, 2005 || Kitt Peak || Spacewatch ||  || align=right | 1.1 km || 
|-id=619 bgcolor=#fefefe
| 585619 ||  || — || September 29, 2008 || Kitt Peak || Spacewatch ||  || align=right data-sort-value="0.55" | 550 m || 
|-id=620 bgcolor=#E9E9E9
| 585620 ||  || — || December 3, 2010 || Mount Lemmon || Mount Lemmon Survey ||  || align=right data-sort-value="0.94" | 940 m || 
|-id=621 bgcolor=#fefefe
| 585621 ||  || — || August 22, 2014 || Haleakala || Pan-STARRS ||  || align=right data-sort-value="0.73" | 730 m || 
|-id=622 bgcolor=#E9E9E9
| 585622 ||  || — || April 12, 2002 || Palomar || NEAT ||  || align=right | 1.9 km || 
|-id=623 bgcolor=#E9E9E9
| 585623 ||  || — || November 11, 2009 || Mount Lemmon || Mount Lemmon Survey ||  || align=right | 1.7 km || 
|-id=624 bgcolor=#d6d6d6
| 585624 ||  || — || October 5, 2013 || Haleakala || Pan-STARRS ||  || align=right | 2.3 km || 
|-id=625 bgcolor=#fefefe
| 585625 ||  || — || July 7, 2014 || Haleakala || Pan-STARRS ||  || align=right data-sort-value="0.67" | 670 m || 
|-id=626 bgcolor=#fefefe
| 585626 ||  || — || November 25, 2011 || Haleakala || Pan-STARRS ||  || align=right data-sort-value="0.57" | 570 m || 
|-id=627 bgcolor=#d6d6d6
| 585627 ||  || — || October 12, 2007 || Mount Lemmon || Mount Lemmon Survey ||  || align=right | 2.3 km || 
|-id=628 bgcolor=#fefefe
| 585628 ||  || — || December 2, 2005 || Mount Lemmon || Mount Lemmon Survey ||  || align=right data-sort-value="0.48" | 480 m || 
|-id=629 bgcolor=#E9E9E9
| 585629 ||  || — || November 25, 2005 || Mount Lemmon || Mount Lemmon Survey ||  || align=right | 1.2 km || 
|-id=630 bgcolor=#fefefe
| 585630 ||  || — || May 7, 2010 || Mount Lemmon || Mount Lemmon Survey ||  || align=right data-sort-value="0.63" | 630 m || 
|-id=631 bgcolor=#fefefe
| 585631 ||  || — || January 10, 2007 || Mount Lemmon || Mount Lemmon Survey ||  || align=right data-sort-value="0.75" | 750 m || 
|-id=632 bgcolor=#fefefe
| 585632 ||  || — || March 9, 2005 || Catalina || CSS ||  || align=right | 1.0 km || 
|-id=633 bgcolor=#d6d6d6
| 585633 ||  || — || November 14, 2013 || Mount Lemmon || Mount Lemmon Survey ||  || align=right | 2.4 km || 
|-id=634 bgcolor=#d6d6d6
| 585634 ||  || — || March 20, 2015 || Haleakala || Pan-STARRS ||  || align=right | 1.9 km || 
|-id=635 bgcolor=#E9E9E9
| 585635 ||  || — || November 6, 2018 || La Palma || La Palma Obs. ||  || align=right | 1.1 km || 
|-id=636 bgcolor=#d6d6d6
| 585636 ||  || — || December 31, 2013 || Haleakala || Pan-STARRS ||  || align=right | 2.4 km || 
|-id=637 bgcolor=#fefefe
| 585637 ||  || — || October 11, 2015 || Catalina || CSS || H || align=right data-sort-value="0.78" | 780 m || 
|-id=638 bgcolor=#E9E9E9
| 585638 ||  || — || April 14, 2008 || Mount Lemmon || Mount Lemmon Survey ||  || align=right | 1.1 km || 
|-id=639 bgcolor=#d6d6d6
| 585639 ||  || — || October 17, 2012 || Mount Lemmon || Mount Lemmon Survey ||  || align=right | 2.4 km || 
|-id=640 bgcolor=#fefefe
| 585640 ||  || — || November 24, 2008 || Mount Lemmon || Mount Lemmon Survey ||  || align=right data-sort-value="0.82" | 820 m || 
|-id=641 bgcolor=#fefefe
| 585641 ||  || — || April 8, 2013 || Siding Spring || SSS ||  || align=right | 1.4 km || 
|-id=642 bgcolor=#fefefe
| 585642 ||  || — || January 17, 2009 || Kitt Peak || Spacewatch ||  || align=right data-sort-value="0.56" | 560 m || 
|-id=643 bgcolor=#fefefe
| 585643 ||  || — || October 12, 2007 || Mount Lemmon || Mount Lemmon Survey ||  || align=right data-sort-value="0.79" | 790 m || 
|-id=644 bgcolor=#d6d6d6
| 585644 ||  || — || March 28, 2015 || Haleakala || Pan-STARRS ||  || align=right | 2.5 km || 
|-id=645 bgcolor=#d6d6d6
| 585645 ||  || — || November 7, 2007 || Kitt Peak || Spacewatch ||  || align=right | 1.9 km || 
|-id=646 bgcolor=#E9E9E9
| 585646 ||  || — || November 26, 2014 || Haleakala || Pan-STARRS ||  || align=right | 1.0 km || 
|-id=647 bgcolor=#d6d6d6
| 585647 ||  || — || October 19, 2012 || Mount Lemmon || Mount Lemmon Survey ||  || align=right | 2.8 km || 
|-id=648 bgcolor=#E9E9E9
| 585648 ||  || — || March 11, 2003 || Palomar || NEAT ||  || align=right data-sort-value="0.76" | 760 m || 
|-id=649 bgcolor=#d6d6d6
| 585649 ||  || — || December 13, 2012 || Mount Lemmon || Mount Lemmon Survey ||  || align=right | 3.5 km || 
|-id=650 bgcolor=#E9E9E9
| 585650 ||  || — || November 1, 2010 || Mount Lemmon || Mount Lemmon Survey ||  || align=right | 1.1 km || 
|-id=651 bgcolor=#d6d6d6
| 585651 ||  || — || January 28, 2015 || Haleakala || Pan-STARRS ||  || align=right | 3.3 km || 
|-id=652 bgcolor=#fefefe
| 585652 ||  || — || December 6, 2000 || Kitt Peak || Spacewatch ||  || align=right data-sort-value="0.97" | 970 m || 
|-id=653 bgcolor=#d6d6d6
| 585653 ||  || — || October 18, 2007 || Kitt Peak || Spacewatch ||  || align=right | 2.5 km || 
|-id=654 bgcolor=#E9E9E9
| 585654 ||  || — || November 26, 2006 || Kitt Peak || Spacewatch ||  || align=right data-sort-value="0.95" | 950 m || 
|-id=655 bgcolor=#d6d6d6
| 585655 ||  || — || December 4, 2007 || Catalina || CSS ||  || align=right | 3.0 km || 
|-id=656 bgcolor=#E9E9E9
| 585656 ||  || — || February 6, 2011 || Catalina || CSS ||  || align=right | 2.0 km || 
|-id=657 bgcolor=#E9E9E9
| 585657 ||  || — || December 10, 2014 || Haleakala || Pan-STARRS ||  || align=right | 1.1 km || 
|-id=658 bgcolor=#E9E9E9
| 585658 ||  || — || December 1, 2014 || Haleakala || Pan-STARRS ||  || align=right data-sort-value="0.96" | 960 m || 
|-id=659 bgcolor=#fefefe
| 585659 ||  || — || January 19, 2004 || Kitt Peak || Spacewatch ||  || align=right data-sort-value="0.84" | 840 m || 
|-id=660 bgcolor=#d6d6d6
| 585660 ||  || — || December 14, 2018 || Haleakala || Pan-STARRS ||  || align=right | 2.3 km || 
|-id=661 bgcolor=#E9E9E9
| 585661 ||  || — || January 4, 2001 || Socorro || LINEAR ||  || align=right | 2.2 km || 
|-id=662 bgcolor=#E9E9E9
| 585662 ||  || — || January 20, 2015 || Mount Lemmon || Mount Lemmon Survey ||  || align=right | 1.4 km || 
|-id=663 bgcolor=#E9E9E9
| 585663 ||  || — || September 14, 2013 || Haleakala || Pan-STARRS ||  || align=right | 1.8 km || 
|-id=664 bgcolor=#d6d6d6
| 585664 ||  || — || July 3, 2000 || Kitt Peak || Spacewatch ||  || align=right | 3.3 km || 
|-id=665 bgcolor=#d6d6d6
| 585665 ||  || — || December 30, 2007 || Mount Lemmon || Mount Lemmon Survey ||  || align=right | 2.2 km || 
|-id=666 bgcolor=#fefefe
| 585666 ||  || — || September 17, 2017 || Haleakala || Pan-STARRS ||  || align=right data-sort-value="0.61" | 610 m || 
|-id=667 bgcolor=#E9E9E9
| 585667 ||  || — || January 7, 2006 || Mount Lemmon || Mount Lemmon Survey ||  || align=right | 1.6 km || 
|-id=668 bgcolor=#E9E9E9
| 585668 ||  || — || October 15, 2001 || Palomar || NEAT ||  || align=right | 1.2 km || 
|-id=669 bgcolor=#E9E9E9
| 585669 ||  || — || February 6, 2007 || Mount Lemmon || Mount Lemmon Survey ||  || align=right | 1.8 km || 
|-id=670 bgcolor=#E9E9E9
| 585670 ||  || — || January 10, 2007 || Catalina || CSS ||  || align=right | 1.3 km || 
|-id=671 bgcolor=#E9E9E9
| 585671 ||  || — || September 9, 2013 || Haleakala || Pan-STARRS ||  || align=right | 1.5 km || 
|-id=672 bgcolor=#E9E9E9
| 585672 ||  || — || November 9, 2009 || Mount Lemmon || Mount Lemmon Survey ||  || align=right | 1.2 km || 
|-id=673 bgcolor=#fefefe
| 585673 ||  || — || January 22, 2004 || Socorro || LINEAR ||  || align=right data-sort-value="0.89" | 890 m || 
|-id=674 bgcolor=#d6d6d6
| 585674 ||  || — || October 7, 2012 || Haleakala || Pan-STARRS ||  || align=right | 3.2 km || 
|-id=675 bgcolor=#E9E9E9
| 585675 ||  || — || January 28, 2015 || Haleakala || Pan-STARRS ||  || align=right | 2.2 km || 
|-id=676 bgcolor=#E9E9E9
| 585676 ||  || — || April 2, 2006 || Kitt Peak || Spacewatch ||  || align=right | 2.0 km || 
|-id=677 bgcolor=#E9E9E9
| 585677 ||  || — || January 17, 2015 || Haleakala || Pan-STARRS ||  || align=right | 1.4 km || 
|-id=678 bgcolor=#d6d6d6
| 585678 ||  || — || October 2, 2006 || Mount Lemmon || Mount Lemmon Survey ||  || align=right | 3.4 km || 
|-id=679 bgcolor=#d6d6d6
| 585679 ||  || — || March 18, 2015 || Haleakala || Pan-STARRS || Tj (2.95) || align=right | 4.2 km || 
|-id=680 bgcolor=#E9E9E9
| 585680 ||  || — || November 27, 2014 || Haleakala || Pan-STARRS ||  || align=right | 1.4 km || 
|-id=681 bgcolor=#d6d6d6
| 585681 ||  || — || November 1, 2007 || Kitt Peak || Spacewatch ||  || align=right | 2.8 km || 
|-id=682 bgcolor=#E9E9E9
| 585682 ||  || — || August 14, 2013 || Haleakala || Pan-STARRS ||  || align=right | 1.2 km || 
|-id=683 bgcolor=#d6d6d6
| 585683 ||  || — || October 29, 2006 || Mount Lemmon || Mount Lemmon Survey ||  || align=right | 2.9 km || 
|-id=684 bgcolor=#E9E9E9
| 585684 ||  || — || January 18, 2015 || Haleakala || Pan-STARRS ||  || align=right | 1.3 km || 
|-id=685 bgcolor=#d6d6d6
| 585685 ||  || — || April 25, 2015 || Haleakala || Pan-STARRS ||  || align=right | 2.0 km || 
|-id=686 bgcolor=#E9E9E9
| 585686 ||  || — || March 26, 2011 || Mount Lemmon || Mount Lemmon Survey ||  || align=right | 2.9 km || 
|-id=687 bgcolor=#E9E9E9
| 585687 ||  || — || January 17, 2011 || Mount Lemmon || Mount Lemmon Survey ||  || align=right | 2.1 km || 
|-id=688 bgcolor=#d6d6d6
| 585688 ||  || — || December 18, 2001 || Socorro || LINEAR ||  || align=right | 2.8 km || 
|-id=689 bgcolor=#d6d6d6
| 585689 ||  || — || October 12, 2007 || Mount Lemmon || Mount Lemmon Survey ||  || align=right | 2.2 km || 
|-id=690 bgcolor=#d6d6d6
| 585690 ||  || — || October 30, 2008 || Mount Lemmon || Mount Lemmon Survey ||  || align=right | 2.9 km || 
|-id=691 bgcolor=#d6d6d6
| 585691 ||  || — || June 19, 2010 || Mount Lemmon || Mount Lemmon Survey ||  || align=right | 3.7 km || 
|-id=692 bgcolor=#E9E9E9
| 585692 ||  || — || January 7, 2010 || Kitt Peak || Spacewatch ||  || align=right | 3.2 km || 
|-id=693 bgcolor=#E9E9E9
| 585693 ||  || — || October 30, 2005 || Catalina || CSS ||  || align=right | 1.8 km || 
|-id=694 bgcolor=#E9E9E9
| 585694 ||  || — || October 7, 2008 || Mount Lemmon || Mount Lemmon Survey ||  || align=right | 2.9 km || 
|-id=695 bgcolor=#E9E9E9
| 585695 ||  || — || November 12, 2005 || Kitt Peak || Spacewatch ||  || align=right | 1.3 km || 
|-id=696 bgcolor=#d6d6d6
| 585696 ||  || — || October 21, 2017 || Haleakala || Pan-STARRS ||  || align=right | 3.6 km || 
|-id=697 bgcolor=#E9E9E9
| 585697 ||  || — || April 1, 2011 || Kitt Peak || Spacewatch ||  || align=right | 1.7 km || 
|-id=698 bgcolor=#E9E9E9
| 585698 ||  || — || September 17, 2004 || Kitt Peak || Spacewatch ||  || align=right | 1.6 km || 
|-id=699 bgcolor=#d6d6d6
| 585699 ||  || — || October 17, 2012 || Mount Lemmon || Mount Lemmon Survey ||  || align=right | 3.0 km || 
|-id=700 bgcolor=#d6d6d6
| 585700 ||  || — || April 17, 2009 || Kitt Peak || Spacewatch ||  || align=right | 2.7 km || 
|}

585701–585800 

|-bgcolor=#E9E9E9
| 585701 ||  || — || February 8, 2007 || Mount Lemmon || Mount Lemmon Survey ||  || align=right data-sort-value="0.81" | 810 m || 
|-id=702 bgcolor=#E9E9E9
| 585702 ||  || — || October 6, 2005 || Mount Lemmon || Mount Lemmon Survey ||  || align=right data-sort-value="0.93" | 930 m || 
|-id=703 bgcolor=#E9E9E9
| 585703 ||  || — || November 14, 1995 || Kitt Peak || Spacewatch ||  || align=right | 2.0 km || 
|-id=704 bgcolor=#E9E9E9
| 585704 ||  || — || October 21, 2009 || Catalina || CSS ||  || align=right | 1.6 km || 
|-id=705 bgcolor=#fefefe
| 585705 ||  || — || February 4, 2016 || Haleakala || Pan-STARRS ||  || align=right data-sort-value="0.82" | 820 m || 
|-id=706 bgcolor=#d6d6d6
| 585706 ||  || — || March 31, 2015 || Haleakala || Pan-STARRS ||  || align=right | 2.4 km || 
|-id=707 bgcolor=#d6d6d6
| 585707 ||  || — || February 18, 2005 || La Silla || A. Boattini ||  || align=right | 2.2 km || 
|-id=708 bgcolor=#d6d6d6
| 585708 ||  || — || October 10, 2012 || Haleakala || Pan-STARRS ||  || align=right | 2.7 km || 
|-id=709 bgcolor=#fefefe
| 585709 ||  || — || January 17, 2016 || Haleakala || Pan-STARRS ||  || align=right data-sort-value="0.99" | 990 m || 
|-id=710 bgcolor=#d6d6d6
| 585710 ||  || — || August 7, 2016 || Haleakala || Pan-STARRS ||  || align=right | 2.4 km || 
|-id=711 bgcolor=#E9E9E9
| 585711 ||  || — || February 7, 2006 || Kitt Peak || Spacewatch ||  || align=right | 1.1 km || 
|-id=712 bgcolor=#E9E9E9
| 585712 ||  || — || November 6, 2008 || Kitt Peak || Spacewatch ||  || align=right | 1.8 km || 
|-id=713 bgcolor=#E9E9E9
| 585713 ||  || — || October 28, 2008 || Kitt Peak || Spacewatch ||  || align=right | 2.0 km || 
|-id=714 bgcolor=#E9E9E9
| 585714 ||  || — || July 29, 2008 || Kitt Peak || Spacewatch ||  || align=right | 1.2 km || 
|-id=715 bgcolor=#d6d6d6
| 585715 ||  || — || October 16, 2012 || Mount Lemmon || Mount Lemmon Survey ||  || align=right | 1.9 km || 
|-id=716 bgcolor=#d6d6d6
| 585716 ||  || — || December 1, 2008 || Mount Lemmon || Mount Lemmon Survey ||  || align=right | 1.9 km || 
|-id=717 bgcolor=#E9E9E9
| 585717 ||  || — || March 5, 2006 || Kitt Peak || Spacewatch ||  || align=right | 1.9 km || 
|-id=718 bgcolor=#d6d6d6
| 585718 ||  || — || February 28, 2009 || Kitt Peak || Spacewatch ||  || align=right | 2.7 km || 
|-id=719 bgcolor=#d6d6d6
| 585719 ||  || — || April 30, 2003 || Kitt Peak || Spacewatch ||  || align=right | 2.4 km || 
|-id=720 bgcolor=#E9E9E9
| 585720 ||  || — || February 7, 2007 || Mount Lemmon || Mount Lemmon Survey ||  || align=right | 1.2 km || 
|-id=721 bgcolor=#E9E9E9
| 585721 ||  || — || December 25, 2005 || Kitt Peak || Spacewatch ||  || align=right | 1.2 km || 
|-id=722 bgcolor=#E9E9E9
| 585722 ||  || — || January 6, 2010 || Kitt Peak || Spacewatch ||  || align=right | 2.3 km || 
|-id=723 bgcolor=#E9E9E9
| 585723 ||  || — || September 28, 2017 || XuYi || PMO NEO ||  || align=right | 2.1 km || 
|-id=724 bgcolor=#E9E9E9
| 585724 ||  || — || December 13, 2006 || Kitt Peak || Spacewatch ||  || align=right data-sort-value="0.76" | 760 m || 
|-id=725 bgcolor=#fefefe
| 585725 ||  || — || February 4, 2006 || Kitt Peak || Spacewatch ||  || align=right data-sort-value="0.63" | 630 m || 
|-id=726 bgcolor=#E9E9E9
| 585726 ||  || — || January 25, 2015 || Haleakala || Pan-STARRS ||  || align=right | 1.4 km || 
|-id=727 bgcolor=#E9E9E9
| 585727 ||  || — || September 5, 2008 || Kitt Peak || Spacewatch ||  || align=right | 1.7 km || 
|-id=728 bgcolor=#d6d6d6
| 585728 ||  || — || April 20, 2009 || Kitt Peak || Spacewatch ||  || align=right | 2.3 km || 
|-id=729 bgcolor=#d6d6d6
| 585729 ||  || — || January 1, 2009 || Kitt Peak || Spacewatch ||  || align=right | 2.2 km || 
|-id=730 bgcolor=#E9E9E9
| 585730 ||  || — || April 6, 2011 || Mount Lemmon || Mount Lemmon Survey ||  || align=right | 2.0 km || 
|-id=731 bgcolor=#d6d6d6
| 585731 ||  || — || January 1, 2008 || Kitt Peak || Spacewatch ||  || align=right | 2.5 km || 
|-id=732 bgcolor=#E9E9E9
| 585732 ||  || — || December 31, 2013 || Mount Lemmon || Mount Lemmon Survey ||  || align=right | 1.7 km || 
|-id=733 bgcolor=#d6d6d6
| 585733 ||  || — || January 14, 2019 || Haleakala || Pan-STARRS ||  || align=right | 1.7 km || 
|-id=734 bgcolor=#FFC2E0
| 585734 ||  || — || January 16, 2019 || Haleakala || Pan-STARRS || APO || align=right data-sort-value="0.13" | 130 m || 
|-id=735 bgcolor=#E9E9E9
| 585735 ||  || — || December 3, 1996 || Kitt Peak || Spacewatch ||  || align=right | 1.7 km || 
|-id=736 bgcolor=#E9E9E9
| 585736 ||  || — || November 30, 2004 || Palomar || NEAT ||  || align=right | 3.0 km || 
|-id=737 bgcolor=#E9E9E9
| 585737 ||  || — || November 6, 2013 || Haleakala || Pan-STARRS ||  || align=right | 2.4 km || 
|-id=738 bgcolor=#E9E9E9
| 585738 ||  || — || January 15, 2015 || Haleakala || Pan-STARRS ||  || align=right | 1.5 km || 
|-id=739 bgcolor=#E9E9E9
| 585739 ||  || — || May 6, 2011 || Mount Lemmon || Mount Lemmon Survey ||  || align=right | 1.7 km || 
|-id=740 bgcolor=#d6d6d6
| 585740 ||  || — || November 22, 2012 || Kitt Peak || Spacewatch ||  || align=right | 3.1 km || 
|-id=741 bgcolor=#E9E9E9
| 585741 ||  || — || December 21, 2014 || Mount Lemmon || Mount Lemmon Survey ||  || align=right data-sort-value="0.73" | 730 m || 
|-id=742 bgcolor=#E9E9E9
| 585742 ||  || — || October 7, 2008 || Mount Lemmon || Mount Lemmon Survey ||  || align=right | 2.0 km || 
|-id=743 bgcolor=#E9E9E9
| 585743 ||  || — || November 8, 2013 || Kitt Peak || Spacewatch ||  || align=right | 2.6 km || 
|-id=744 bgcolor=#d6d6d6
| 585744 ||  || — || October 25, 2017 || Mount Lemmon || Mount Lemmon Survey ||  || align=right | 3.3 km || 
|-id=745 bgcolor=#E9E9E9
| 585745 ||  || — || October 29, 2005 || Mount Lemmon || Mount Lemmon Survey ||  || align=right | 1.4 km || 
|-id=746 bgcolor=#d6d6d6
| 585746 ||  || — || February 14, 2009 || Kitt Peak || Spacewatch ||  || align=right | 2.6 km || 
|-id=747 bgcolor=#d6d6d6
| 585747 ||  || — || January 14, 2008 || Kanab || E. E. Sheridan ||  || align=right | 2.4 km || 
|-id=748 bgcolor=#d6d6d6
| 585748 ||  || — || January 31, 2009 || Kitt Peak || Spacewatch ||  || align=right | 2.7 km || 
|-id=749 bgcolor=#E9E9E9
| 585749 ||  || — || February 5, 2011 || Mount Lemmon || Mount Lemmon Survey ||  || align=right | 1.5 km || 
|-id=750 bgcolor=#d6d6d6
| 585750 ||  || — || January 19, 2008 || Mount Lemmon || Mount Lemmon Survey ||  || align=right | 1.9 km || 
|-id=751 bgcolor=#E9E9E9
| 585751 ||  || — || January 22, 2006 || Mount Lemmon || Mount Lemmon Survey ||  || align=right | 1.5 km || 
|-id=752 bgcolor=#fefefe
| 585752 ||  || — || December 5, 2007 || Kitt Peak || Spacewatch ||  || align=right data-sort-value="0.85" | 850 m || 
|-id=753 bgcolor=#E9E9E9
| 585753 ||  || — || September 15, 2013 || Haleakala || Pan-STARRS ||  || align=right | 1.5 km || 
|-id=754 bgcolor=#E9E9E9
| 585754 ||  || — || October 26, 2000 || Kitt Peak || Spacewatch ||  || align=right | 1.7 km || 
|-id=755 bgcolor=#fefefe
| 585755 ||  || — || December 2, 2010 || Mount Lemmon || Mount Lemmon Survey ||  || align=right data-sort-value="0.80" | 800 m || 
|-id=756 bgcolor=#d6d6d6
| 585756 ||  || — || April 11, 2002 || Palomar || NEAT ||  || align=right | 3.6 km || 
|-id=757 bgcolor=#fefefe
| 585757 ||  || — || February 4, 2009 || Mount Lemmon || Mount Lemmon Survey ||  || align=right data-sort-value="0.65" | 650 m || 
|-id=758 bgcolor=#fefefe
| 585758 ||  || — || October 15, 2007 || Kitt Peak || Spacewatch ||  || align=right data-sort-value="0.55" | 550 m || 
|-id=759 bgcolor=#d6d6d6
| 585759 ||  || — || April 7, 2014 || Mount Lemmon || Mount Lemmon Survey || Tj (2.99) || align=right | 3.3 km || 
|-id=760 bgcolor=#d6d6d6
| 585760 ||  || — || November 19, 2012 || Kitt Peak || Spacewatch ||  || align=right | 2.4 km || 
|-id=761 bgcolor=#d6d6d6
| 585761 ||  || — || October 23, 2011 || Mount Lemmon || Mount Lemmon Survey ||  || align=right | 3.3 km || 
|-id=762 bgcolor=#E9E9E9
| 585762 ||  || — || October 31, 2008 || Mount Lemmon || Mount Lemmon Survey ||  || align=right | 2.4 km || 
|-id=763 bgcolor=#d6d6d6
| 585763 ||  || — || September 15, 2004 || Kitt Peak || Spacewatch ||  || align=right | 2.8 km || 
|-id=764 bgcolor=#d6d6d6
| 585764 ||  || — || October 30, 2011 || Mount Lemmon || Mount Lemmon Survey ||  || align=right | 2.9 km || 
|-id=765 bgcolor=#C2FFFF
| 585765 ||  || — || October 6, 2012 || Haleakala || Pan-STARRS || L5 || align=right | 7.3 km || 
|-id=766 bgcolor=#d6d6d6
| 585766 ||  || — || February 5, 2019 || Haleakala || Pan-STARRS ||  || align=right | 2.5 km || 
|-id=767 bgcolor=#d6d6d6
| 585767 ||  || — || January 12, 2018 || Haleakala || Pan-STARRS ||  || align=right | 2.6 km || 
|-id=768 bgcolor=#d6d6d6
| 585768 ||  || — || September 19, 1995 || Kitt Peak || Spacewatch ||  || align=right | 3.7 km || 
|-id=769 bgcolor=#E9E9E9
| 585769 ||  || — || September 23, 2008 || Kitt Peak || Spacewatch ||  || align=right | 1.2 km || 
|-id=770 bgcolor=#d6d6d6
| 585770 ||  || — || March 28, 2009 || Kitt Peak || Spacewatch ||  || align=right | 2.1 km || 
|-id=771 bgcolor=#d6d6d6
| 585771 ||  || — || February 27, 2008 || Kitt Peak || Spacewatch ||  || align=right | 2.1 km || 
|-id=772 bgcolor=#d6d6d6
| 585772 ||  || — || March 29, 2019 || Mount Lemmon || Mount Lemmon Survey ||  || align=right | 2.0 km || 
|-id=773 bgcolor=#C2FFFF
| 585773 ||  || — || January 12, 2016 || Haleakala || Pan-STARRS || L5 || align=right | 7.7 km || 
|-id=774 bgcolor=#d6d6d6
| 585774 ||  || — || February 27, 2008 || Kitt Peak || Spacewatch ||  || align=right | 2.5 km || 
|-id=775 bgcolor=#d6d6d6
| 585775 ||  || — || May 20, 2014 || Haleakala || Pan-STARRS ||  || align=right | 3.1 km || 
|-id=776 bgcolor=#fefefe
| 585776 ||  || — || May 14, 2005 || Kitt Peak || Spacewatch ||  || align=right data-sort-value="0.65" | 650 m || 
|-id=777 bgcolor=#d6d6d6
| 585777 ||  || — || April 5, 2008 || Mount Lemmon || Mount Lemmon Survey ||  || align=right | 2.8 km || 
|-id=778 bgcolor=#fefefe
| 585778 ||  || — || December 31, 2007 || Mount Lemmon || Mount Lemmon Survey ||  || align=right data-sort-value="0.62" | 620 m || 
|-id=779 bgcolor=#d6d6d6
| 585779 ||  || — || April 5, 2014 || Haleakala || Pan-STARRS ||  || align=right | 2.1 km || 
|-id=780 bgcolor=#fefefe
| 585780 ||  || — || April 1, 2008 || Kitt Peak || Spacewatch ||  || align=right data-sort-value="0.59" | 590 m || 
|-id=781 bgcolor=#d6d6d6
| 585781 ||  || — || March 19, 2009 || Kitt Peak || Spacewatch ||  || align=right | 2.1 km || 
|-id=782 bgcolor=#d6d6d6
| 585782 ||  || — || November 11, 2001 || Apache Point || SDSS Collaboration ||  || align=right | 2.4 km || 
|-id=783 bgcolor=#d6d6d6
| 585783 ||  || — || April 5, 2014 || Haleakala || Pan-STARRS ||  || align=right | 2.1 km || 
|-id=784 bgcolor=#C2FFFF
| 585784 ||  || — || April 29, 2008 || Mount Lemmon || Mount Lemmon Survey || L5 || align=right | 7.0 km || 
|-id=785 bgcolor=#E9E9E9
| 585785 ||  || — || February 16, 2010 || Kitt Peak || Spacewatch ||  || align=right | 1.2 km || 
|-id=786 bgcolor=#E9E9E9
| 585786 ||  || — || December 24, 2013 || Mount Lemmon || Mount Lemmon Survey ||  || align=right | 1.2 km || 
|-id=787 bgcolor=#d6d6d6
| 585787 ||  || — || October 14, 2010 || Mount Lemmon || Mount Lemmon Survey ||  || align=right | 2.7 km || 
|-id=788 bgcolor=#E9E9E9
| 585788 ||  || — || January 6, 2010 || Kitt Peak || Spacewatch ||  || align=right | 1.1 km || 
|-id=789 bgcolor=#E9E9E9
| 585789 ||  || — || April 2, 2019 || Haleakala || Pan-STARRS ||  || align=right data-sort-value="0.97" | 970 m || 
|-id=790 bgcolor=#E9E9E9
| 585790 ||  || — || April 15, 2010 || Kitt Peak || Spacewatch ||  || align=right | 1.6 km || 
|-id=791 bgcolor=#d6d6d6
| 585791 ||  || — || February 10, 2008 || Kitt Peak || Spacewatch ||  || align=right | 2.9 km || 
|-id=792 bgcolor=#d6d6d6
| 585792 ||  || — || February 29, 2008 || Kitt Peak || Spacewatch || Tj (2.93) || align=right | 3.3 km || 
|-id=793 bgcolor=#fefefe
| 585793 ||  || — || April 24, 2012 || Haleakala || Pan-STARRS ||  || align=right data-sort-value="0.54" | 540 m || 
|-id=794 bgcolor=#d6d6d6
| 585794 ||  || — || February 19, 2007 || Mount Lemmon || Mount Lemmon Survey ||  || align=right | 3.0 km || 
|-id=795 bgcolor=#d6d6d6
| 585795 ||  || — || September 28, 2011 || Mount Lemmon || Mount Lemmon Survey ||  || align=right | 1.7 km || 
|-id=796 bgcolor=#fefefe
| 585796 ||  || — || July 29, 2008 || Kitt Peak || Spacewatch ||  || align=right data-sort-value="0.72" | 720 m || 
|-id=797 bgcolor=#E9E9E9
| 585797 ||  || — || April 26, 2019 || Mount Lemmon || Mount Lemmon Survey ||  || align=right | 1.3 km || 
|-id=798 bgcolor=#E9E9E9
| 585798 ||  || — || June 14, 2011 || Mount Lemmon || Mount Lemmon Survey ||  || align=right | 2.3 km || 
|-id=799 bgcolor=#fefefe
| 585799 ||  || — || April 26, 2008 || Kitt Peak || Spacewatch ||  || align=right data-sort-value="0.84" | 840 m || 
|-id=800 bgcolor=#d6d6d6
| 585800 ||  || — || March 6, 2008 || Mount Lemmon || Mount Lemmon Survey ||  || align=right | 2.3 km || 
|}

585801–585900 

|-bgcolor=#E9E9E9
| 585801 ||  || — || May 21, 2015 || Haleakala || Pan-STARRS ||  || align=right | 1.7 km || 
|-id=802 bgcolor=#fefefe
| 585802 ||  || — || January 16, 2005 || Mauna Kea || Mauna Kea Obs. ||  || align=right data-sort-value="0.47" | 470 m || 
|-id=803 bgcolor=#d6d6d6
| 585803 ||  || — || June 24, 2014 || Mount Lemmon || Mount Lemmon Survey ||  || align=right | 2.3 km || 
|-id=804 bgcolor=#d6d6d6
| 585804 ||  || — || November 10, 2010 || Mount Lemmon || Mount Lemmon Survey ||  || align=right | 2.4 km || 
|-id=805 bgcolor=#fefefe
| 585805 ||  || — || November 9, 2007 || Kitt Peak || Spacewatch ||  || align=right data-sort-value="0.66" | 660 m || 
|-id=806 bgcolor=#E9E9E9
| 585806 ||  || — || March 19, 2010 || Kitt Peak || Spacewatch ||  || align=right | 1.7 km || 
|-id=807 bgcolor=#fefefe
| 585807 ||  || — || September 17, 2009 || Kitt Peak || Spacewatch ||  || align=right data-sort-value="0.62" | 620 m || 
|-id=808 bgcolor=#d6d6d6
| 585808 ||  || — || April 20, 2009 || Kitt Peak || Spacewatch ||  || align=right | 2.0 km || 
|-id=809 bgcolor=#d6d6d6
| 585809 ||  || — || January 23, 2018 || Mount Lemmon || Mount Lemmon Survey ||  || align=right | 2.2 km || 
|-id=810 bgcolor=#d6d6d6
| 585810 ||  || — || January 12, 2018 || Mount Lemmon || Mount Lemmon Survey ||  || align=right | 2.5 km || 
|-id=811 bgcolor=#fefefe
| 585811 ||  || — || November 28, 2013 || Mount Lemmon || Mount Lemmon Survey ||  || align=right data-sort-value="0.75" | 750 m || 
|-id=812 bgcolor=#fefefe
| 585812 ||  || — || January 21, 2015 || Haleakala || Pan-STARRS ||  || align=right data-sort-value="0.66" | 660 m || 
|-id=813 bgcolor=#E9E9E9
| 585813 ||  || — || November 11, 2013 || Kitt Peak || Spacewatch ||  || align=right data-sort-value="0.76" | 760 m || 
|-id=814 bgcolor=#d6d6d6
| 585814 ||  || — || April 10, 2013 || Haleakala || Pan-STARRS ||  || align=right | 2.4 km || 
|-id=815 bgcolor=#d6d6d6
| 585815 ||  || — || January 19, 2012 || Kitt Peak || Spacewatch ||  || align=right | 2.2 km || 
|-id=816 bgcolor=#d6d6d6
| 585816 ||  || — || March 1, 2008 || Kitt Peak || Spacewatch ||  || align=right | 1.9 km || 
|-id=817 bgcolor=#E9E9E9
| 585817 ||  || — || October 13, 2016 || Mount Lemmon || Mount Lemmon Survey ||  || align=right | 2.6 km || 
|-id=818 bgcolor=#fefefe
| 585818 ||  || — || April 4, 2008 || Kitt Peak || Spacewatch ||  || align=right data-sort-value="0.86" | 860 m || 
|-id=819 bgcolor=#d6d6d6
| 585819 ||  || — || May 25, 2003 || Kitt Peak || Spacewatch ||  || align=right | 2.8 km || 
|-id=820 bgcolor=#E9E9E9
| 585820 ||  || — || June 17, 2010 || Mount Lemmon || Mount Lemmon Survey ||  || align=right | 1.8 km || 
|-id=821 bgcolor=#d6d6d6
| 585821 ||  || — || July 19, 2015 || Haleakala || Pan-STARRS ||  || align=right | 2.3 km || 
|-id=822 bgcolor=#E9E9E9
| 585822 ||  || — || March 5, 2006 || Kitt Peak || Spacewatch ||  || align=right | 1.6 km || 
|-id=823 bgcolor=#fefefe
| 585823 ||  || — || December 1, 2014 || Haleakala || Pan-STARRS ||  || align=right data-sort-value="0.90" | 900 m || 
|-id=824 bgcolor=#d6d6d6
| 585824 ||  || — || October 5, 2015 || Haleakala || Pan-STARRS ||  || align=right | 2.5 km || 
|-id=825 bgcolor=#E9E9E9
| 585825 ||  || — || November 30, 2003 || Kitt Peak || Spacewatch ||  || align=right | 1.4 km || 
|-id=826 bgcolor=#E9E9E9
| 585826 ||  || — || August 10, 2007 || Kitt Peak || Spacewatch ||  || align=right | 1.1 km || 
|-id=827 bgcolor=#E9E9E9
| 585827 ||  || — || May 8, 2019 || Haleakala || Pan-STARRS ||  || align=right | 1.7 km || 
|-id=828 bgcolor=#E9E9E9
| 585828 ||  || — || August 30, 2002 || Kitt Peak || Spacewatch ||  || align=right | 1.5 km || 
|-id=829 bgcolor=#d6d6d6
| 585829 ||  || — || March 9, 2005 || Mount Lemmon || Mount Lemmon Survey || 7:4 || align=right | 3.6 km || 
|-id=830 bgcolor=#E9E9E9
| 585830 ||  || — || December 8, 2012 || Mount Lemmon || Mount Lemmon Survey ||  || align=right data-sort-value="0.94" | 940 m || 
|-id=831 bgcolor=#E9E9E9
| 585831 ||  || — || April 12, 2015 || Haleakala || Pan-STARRS ||  || align=right data-sort-value="0.74" | 740 m || 
|-id=832 bgcolor=#E9E9E9
| 585832 ||  || — || July 19, 2015 || Haleakala || Pan-STARRS ||  || align=right | 1.8 km || 
|-id=833 bgcolor=#d6d6d6
| 585833 ||  || — || October 27, 2006 || Mount Lemmon || Mount Lemmon Survey ||  || align=right | 2.2 km || 
|-id=834 bgcolor=#d6d6d6
| 585834 ||  || — || October 16, 2015 || Kitt Peak || Spacewatch ||  || align=right | 2.4 km || 
|-id=835 bgcolor=#d6d6d6
| 585835 ||  || — || May 2, 2019 || Haleakala || Pan-STARRS ||  || align=right | 2.5 km || 
|-id=836 bgcolor=#E9E9E9
| 585836 ||  || — || May 3, 2019 || Mount Lemmon || Mount Lemmon Survey ||  || align=right | 1.8 km || 
|-id=837 bgcolor=#d6d6d6
| 585837 ||  || — || May 8, 2019 || Haleakala || Pan-STARRS ||  || align=right | 2.2 km || 
|-id=838 bgcolor=#fefefe
| 585838 ||  || — || May 9, 2019 || Mount Lemmon || Mount Lemmon Survey || H || align=right data-sort-value="0.59" | 590 m || 
|-id=839 bgcolor=#d6d6d6
| 585839 ||  || — || May 12, 2019 || Haleakala || Pan-STARRS ||  || align=right | 2.3 km || 
|-id=840 bgcolor=#d6d6d6
| 585840 ||  || — || May 7, 2019 || Haleakala || Pan-STARRS ||  || align=right | 2.2 km || 
|-id=841 bgcolor=#E9E9E9
| 585841 ||  || — || May 4, 2002 || Socorro || LINEAR ||  || align=right | 1.1 km || 
|-id=842 bgcolor=#FA8072
| 585842 ||  || — || September 24, 1998 || Anderson Mesa || LONEOS ||  || align=right data-sort-value="0.77" | 770 m || 
|-id=843 bgcolor=#C2FFFF
| 585843 ||  || — || May 29, 2019 || Haleakala || Pan-STARRS || L4 || align=right | 7.7 km || 
|-id=844 bgcolor=#C2FFFF
| 585844 ||  || — || September 14, 2013 || Haleakala || Pan-STARRS || L5 || align=right | 7.7 km || 
|-id=845 bgcolor=#C2FFFF
| 585845 ||  || — || April 12, 2015 || Haleakala || Pan-STARRS || L4 || align=right | 8.6 km || 
|-id=846 bgcolor=#fefefe
| 585846 ||  || — || May 28, 2014 || Haleakala || Pan-STARRS ||  || align=right data-sort-value="0.78" | 780 m || 
|-id=847 bgcolor=#C2FFFF
| 585847 ||  || — || November 19, 2009 || Mount Lemmon || Mount Lemmon Survey || L4 || align=right | 9.0 km || 
|-id=848 bgcolor=#d6d6d6
| 585848 ||  || — || May 26, 2019 || Mount Lemmon || Mount Lemmon Survey ||  || align=right | 2.2 km || 
|-id=849 bgcolor=#E9E9E9
| 585849 ||  || — || September 8, 2011 || Kitt Peak || Spacewatch ||  || align=right | 1.8 km || 
|-id=850 bgcolor=#d6d6d6
| 585850 ||  || — || December 10, 2005 || Kitt Peak || Spacewatch ||  || align=right | 3.2 km || 
|-id=851 bgcolor=#C2FFFF
| 585851 ||  || — || September 22, 2009 || Kitt Peak || Spacewatch || L4 || align=right | 6.5 km || 
|-id=852 bgcolor=#C2FFFF
| 585852 ||  || — || May 15, 2009 || Mount Lemmon || Mount Lemmon Survey || L5 || align=right | 9.7 km || 
|-id=853 bgcolor=#E9E9E9
| 585853 ||  || — || March 13, 2010 || Kitt Peak || Spacewatch ||  || align=right | 1.5 km || 
|-id=854 bgcolor=#d6d6d6
| 585854 ||  || — || June 2, 2019 || Haleakala || Pan-STARRS ||  || align=right | 2.8 km || 
|-id=855 bgcolor=#C2FFFF
| 585855 ||  || — || April 24, 2008 || Kitt Peak || Spacewatch || L5 || align=right | 11 km || 
|-id=856 bgcolor=#E9E9E9
| 585856 ||  || — || November 23, 2016 || Mount Lemmon || Mount Lemmon Survey ||  || align=right data-sort-value="0.84" | 840 m || 
|-id=857 bgcolor=#E9E9E9
| 585857 ||  || — || May 8, 2019 || Haleakala || Pan-STARRS ||  || align=right data-sort-value="0.94" | 940 m || 
|-id=858 bgcolor=#d6d6d6
| 585858 ||  || — || March 18, 2017 || Haleakala || Pan-STARRS ||  || align=right | 2.8 km || 
|-id=859 bgcolor=#d6d6d6
| 585859 ||  || — || February 16, 2004 || Kitt Peak || Spacewatch || 7:4 || align=right | 3.6 km || 
|-id=860 bgcolor=#d6d6d6
| 585860 ||  || — || February 8, 1999 || Mauna Kea || C. Veillet, J. Anderson ||  || align=right | 2.0 km || 
|-id=861 bgcolor=#d6d6d6
| 585861 ||  || — || September 21, 2003 || Kitt Peak || Spacewatch ||  || align=right | 1.9 km || 
|-id=862 bgcolor=#C2FFFF
| 585862 ||  || — || October 29, 2010 || Mount Lemmon || Mount Lemmon Survey || L4 || align=right | 9.2 km || 
|-id=863 bgcolor=#fefefe
| 585863 ||  || — || November 30, 2014 || Mount Lemmon || Mount Lemmon Survey || H || align=right data-sort-value="0.49" | 490 m || 
|-id=864 bgcolor=#FA8072
| 585864 ||  || — || September 15, 2009 || Kitt Peak || Spacewatch ||  || align=right data-sort-value="0.62" | 620 m || 
|-id=865 bgcolor=#fefefe
| 585865 ||  || — || May 31, 2013 || Kitt Peak || Spacewatch || H || align=right data-sort-value="0.62" | 620 m || 
|-id=866 bgcolor=#FA8072
| 585866 ||  || — || May 28, 2014 || Haleakala || Pan-STARRS || H || align=right data-sort-value="0.73" | 730 m || 
|-id=867 bgcolor=#FA8072
| 585867 ||  || — || July 25, 2014 || Haleakala || Pan-STARRS || H || align=right data-sort-value="0.53" | 530 m || 
|-id=868 bgcolor=#d6d6d6
| 585868 ||  || — || November 1, 2014 || Mount Lemmon || Mount Lemmon Survey ||  || align=right | 2.3 km || 
|-id=869 bgcolor=#fefefe
| 585869 ||  || — || August 20, 2006 || Kitt Peak || Spacewatch || H || align=right data-sort-value="0.56" | 560 m || 
|-id=870 bgcolor=#E9E9E9
| 585870 ||  || — || October 12, 2010 || Kitt Peak || Spacewatch ||  || align=right | 1.3 km || 
|-id=871 bgcolor=#E9E9E9
| 585871 ||  || — || October 24, 2019 || Haleakala || Pan-STARRS ||  || align=right | 1.3 km || 
|-id=872 bgcolor=#fefefe
| 585872 ||  || — || November 29, 2014 || Haleakala || Pan-STARRS || H || align=right data-sort-value="0.59" | 590 m || 
|-id=873 bgcolor=#d6d6d6
| 585873 ||  || — || October 23, 2008 || Kitt Peak || Spacewatch ||  || align=right | 2.8 km || 
|-id=874 bgcolor=#FA8072
| 585874 ||  || — || October 25, 2019 || Haleakala || Pan-STARRS || H || align=right data-sort-value="0.44" | 440 m || 
|-id=875 bgcolor=#fefefe
| 585875 ||  || — || January 28, 2018 || Mount Lemmon || Mount Lemmon Survey || H || align=right data-sort-value="0.68" | 680 m || 
|-id=876 bgcolor=#E9E9E9
| 585876 ||  || — || March 13, 2016 || Haleakala || Pan-STARRS ||  || align=right | 1.7 km || 
|-id=877 bgcolor=#E9E9E9
| 585877 ||  || — || January 7, 2006 || Kitt Peak || Spacewatch ||  || align=right | 2.1 km || 
|-id=878 bgcolor=#d6d6d6
| 585878 ||  || — || February 8, 2013 || Haleakala || Pan-STARRS || 7:4 || align=right | 2.8 km || 
|-id=879 bgcolor=#d6d6d6
| 585879 ||  || — || January 23, 2015 || Haleakala || Pan-STARRS ||  || align=right | 2.0 km || 
|-id=880 bgcolor=#E9E9E9
| 585880 ||  || — || February 19, 2020 || Palomar || PTF ||  || align=right data-sort-value="0.63" | 630 m || 
|-id=881 bgcolor=#d6d6d6
| 585881 ||  || — || May 22, 2015 || Haleakala || Pan-STARRS ||  || align=right | 2.0 km || 
|-id=882 bgcolor=#d6d6d6
| 585882 ||  || — || August 27, 2016 || Haleakala || Pan-STARRS ||  || align=right | 2.5 km || 
|-id=883 bgcolor=#d6d6d6
| 585883 ||  || — || April 30, 2009 || Mount Lemmon || Mount Lemmon Survey ||  || align=right | 2.6 km || 
|-id=884 bgcolor=#d6d6d6
| 585884 ||  || — || March 24, 2014 || Haleakala || Pan-STARRS ||  || align=right | 2.6 km || 
|-id=885 bgcolor=#d6d6d6
| 585885 ||  || — || September 27, 2016 || Haleakala || Pan-STARRS ||  || align=right | 2.7 km || 
|-id=886 bgcolor=#d6d6d6
| 585886 ||  || — || January 11, 2008 || Kitt Peak || Spacewatch ||  || align=right | 2.7 km || 
|-id=887 bgcolor=#d6d6d6
| 585887 ||  || — || March 2, 2009 || Mount Lemmon || Mount Lemmon Survey ||  || align=right | 2.3 km || 
|-id=888 bgcolor=#d6d6d6
| 585888 ||  || — || January 31, 2009 || Mount Lemmon || Mount Lemmon Survey ||  || align=right | 2.0 km || 
|-id=889 bgcolor=#fefefe
| 585889 ||  || — || July 13, 2013 || Haleakala || Pan-STARRS ||  || align=right data-sort-value="0.58" | 580 m || 
|-id=890 bgcolor=#d6d6d6
| 585890 ||  || — || October 3, 2006 || Mount Lemmon || Mount Lemmon Survey ||  || align=right | 2.3 km || 
|-id=891 bgcolor=#d6d6d6
| 585891 ||  || — || September 19, 2011 || Haleakala || Pan-STARRS ||  || align=right | 2.3 km || 
|-id=892 bgcolor=#d6d6d6
| 585892 ||  || — || June 30, 2015 || Haleakala || Pan-STARRS ||  || align=right | 2.4 km || 
|-id=893 bgcolor=#d6d6d6
| 585893 ||  || — || April 8, 2014 || Mount Lemmon || Mount Lemmon Survey ||  || align=right | 2.4 km || 
|-id=894 bgcolor=#d6d6d6
| 585894 ||  || — || August 2, 2016 || Haleakala || Pan-STARRS ||  || align=right | 2.5 km || 
|-id=895 bgcolor=#d6d6d6
| 585895 ||  || — || October 17, 2017 || Mount Lemmon || Mount Lemmon Survey ||  || align=right | 2.7 km || 
|-id=896 bgcolor=#d6d6d6
| 585896 ||  || — || April 24, 2014 || Mount Lemmon || Mount Lemmon Survey ||  || align=right | 2.1 km || 
|-id=897 bgcolor=#d6d6d6
| 585897 ||  || — || September 24, 2011 || Mount Lemmon || Mount Lemmon Survey ||  || align=right | 2.5 km || 
|-id=898 bgcolor=#C2FFFF
| 585898 ||  || — || October 10, 2012 || Mount Lemmon || Mount Lemmon Survey || L5 || align=right | 6.8 km || 
|-id=899 bgcolor=#C2E0FF
| 585899 ||  || — || April 19, 2020 || Haleakala || Pan-STARRS || centaurdamocloid || align=right | 36 km || 
|-id=900 bgcolor=#E9E9E9
| 585900 ||  || — || January 8, 2011 || Mount Lemmon || Mount Lemmon Survey ||  || align=right data-sort-value="0.81" | 810 m || 
|}

585901–586000 

|-bgcolor=#d6d6d6
| 585901 ||  || — || January 22, 2013 || Mount Lemmon || Mount Lemmon Survey ||  || align=right | 2.8 km || 
|-id=902 bgcolor=#d6d6d6
| 585902 ||  || — || November 23, 2006 || Kitt Peak || Spacewatch ||  || align=right | 2.3 km || 
|-id=903 bgcolor=#d6d6d6
| 585903 ||  || — || March 3, 2009 || Kitt Peak || Spacewatch ||  || align=right | 2.2 km || 
|-id=904 bgcolor=#d6d6d6
| 585904 ||  || — || December 14, 2010 || Mount Lemmon || Mount Lemmon Survey || 7:4 || align=right | 3.3 km || 
|-id=905 bgcolor=#d6d6d6
| 585905 ||  || — || April 21, 2014 || Mount Lemmon || Mount Lemmon Survey ||  || align=right | 2.6 km || 
|-id=906 bgcolor=#d6d6d6
| 585906 ||  || — || October 25, 2011 || Haleakala || Pan-STARRS ||  || align=right | 2.5 km || 
|-id=907 bgcolor=#C2FFFF
| 585907 ||  || — || November 26, 2011 || Mount Lemmon || Mount Lemmon Survey || L4 || align=right | 7.5 km || 
|-id=908 bgcolor=#fefefe
| 585908 ||  || — || May 15, 2013 || Haleakala || Pan-STARRS ||  || align=right data-sort-value="0.62" | 620 m || 
|-id=909 bgcolor=#E9E9E9
| 585909 ||  || — || January 31, 2011 || Charleston || R. Holmes ||  || align=right | 1.1 km || 
|-id=910 bgcolor=#d6d6d6
| 585910 ||  || — || February 26, 2014 || Haleakala || Pan-STARRS ||  || align=right | 2.1 km || 
|-id=911 bgcolor=#d6d6d6
| 585911 ||  || — || January 16, 2018 || Haleakala || Pan-STARRS ||  || align=right | 3.0 km || 
|-id=912 bgcolor=#C2E0FF
| 585912 ||  || — || August 18, 2020 || XuYi || PMO NEO || centaurcritical || align=right | 68 km || 
|-id=913 bgcolor=#C2E0FF
| 585913 ||  || — || August 16, 2020 || XuYi || PMO NEO || centaurcritical || align=right | 60 km || 
|-id=914 bgcolor=#fefefe
| 585914 ||  || — || August 26, 2005 || Palomar || NEAT ||  || align=right data-sort-value="0.59" | 590 m || 
|-id=915 bgcolor=#C2FFFF
| 585915 ||  || — || October 29, 2008 || Mount Lemmon || Mount Lemmon Survey || L4 || align=right | 7.1 km || 
|-id=916 bgcolor=#E9E9E9
| 585916 ||  || — || September 13, 2007 || Mount Lemmon || Mount Lemmon Survey ||  || align=right | 1.2 km || 
|-id=917 bgcolor=#fefefe
| 585917 ||  || — || September 24, 2013 || Mount Lemmon || Mount Lemmon Survey ||  || align=right data-sort-value="0.52" | 520 m || 
|-id=918 bgcolor=#E9E9E9
| 585918 ||  || — || February 3, 2009 || Kitt Peak || Spacewatch ||  || align=right data-sort-value="0.71" | 710 m || 
|-id=919 bgcolor=#E9E9E9
| 585919 ||  || — || April 29, 2008 || Mount Lemmon || Mount Lemmon Survey ||  || align=right | 1.8 km || 
|-id=920 bgcolor=#d6d6d6
| 585920 ||  || — || October 1, 2014 || Haleakala || Pan-STARRS ||  || align=right | 2.5 km || 
|-id=921 bgcolor=#E9E9E9
| 585921 ||  || — || March 5, 2008 || Mount Lemmon || Mount Lemmon Survey ||  || align=right | 1.3 km || 
|-id=922 bgcolor=#E9E9E9
| 585922 ||  || — || September 30, 2010 || Mount Lemmon || Mount Lemmon Survey ||  || align=right data-sort-value="0.87" | 870 m || 
|-id=923 bgcolor=#E9E9E9
| 585923 ||  || — || March 24, 2012 || Kitt Peak || Spacewatch ||  || align=right | 1.8 km || 
|-id=924 bgcolor=#E9E9E9
| 585924 ||  || — || April 1, 2012 || Haleakala || Pan-STARRS ||  || align=right | 1.8 km || 
|-id=925 bgcolor=#E9E9E9
| 585925 ||  || — || October 24, 2019 || Mount Lemmon || Mount Lemmon Survey ||  || align=right | 1.2 km || 
|-id=926 bgcolor=#E9E9E9
| 585926 ||  || — || September 11, 2005 || Kitt Peak || Spacewatch ||  || align=right | 1.1 km || 
|-id=927 bgcolor=#E9E9E9
| 585927 ||  || — || September 25, 2005 || Kitt Peak || Spacewatch ||  || align=right | 1.1 km || 
|-id=928 bgcolor=#fefefe
| 585928 ||  || — || September 4, 2011 || Haleakala || Pan-STARRS ||  || align=right data-sort-value="0.67" | 670 m || 
|-id=929 bgcolor=#fefefe
| 585929 ||  || — || May 28, 2008 || Mount Lemmon || Mount Lemmon Survey ||  || align=right data-sort-value="0.47" | 470 m || 
|-id=930 bgcolor=#d6d6d6
| 585930 ||  || — || February 18, 2015 || Haleakala || Pan-STARRS ||  || align=right | 2.2 km || 
|-id=931 bgcolor=#E9E9E9
| 585931 ||  || — || January 13, 2016 || Haleakala || Pan-STARRS ||  || align=right | 1.0 km || 
|-id=932 bgcolor=#fefefe
| 585932 ||  || — || October 24, 2011 || Haleakala || Pan-STARRS ||  || align=right data-sort-value="0.58" | 580 m || 
|-id=933 bgcolor=#fefefe
| 585933 ||  || — || February 4, 2006 || Kitt Peak || Spacewatch ||  || align=right data-sort-value="0.54" | 540 m || 
|-id=934 bgcolor=#d6d6d6
| 585934 ||  || — || October 17, 2012 || Haleakala || Pan-STARRS ||  || align=right | 1.8 km || 
|-id=935 bgcolor=#d6d6d6
| 585935 ||  || — || September 13, 2017 || Haleakala || Pan-STARRS ||  || align=right | 1.9 km || 
|-id=936 bgcolor=#E9E9E9
| 585936 ||  || — || March 15, 2008 || Mount Lemmon || Mount Lemmon Survey ||  || align=right | 1.1 km || 
|-id=937 bgcolor=#E9E9E9
| 585937 ||  || — || September 24, 2008 || Mount Lemmon || Mount Lemmon Survey ||  || align=right | 1.7 km || 
|-id=938 bgcolor=#d6d6d6
| 585938 ||  || — || January 17, 2015 || Haleakala || Pan-STARRS ||  || align=right | 2.1 km || 
|-id=939 bgcolor=#fefefe
| 585939 ||  || — || April 4, 2014 || Mount Lemmon || Mount Lemmon Survey ||  || align=right data-sort-value="0.51" | 510 m || 
|-id=940 bgcolor=#E9E9E9
| 585940 ||  || — || January 31, 2016 || Haleakala || Pan-STARRS ||  || align=right | 1.3 km || 
|-id=941 bgcolor=#fefefe
| 585941 ||  || — || September 26, 2008 || Kitt Peak || Spacewatch ||  || align=right data-sort-value="0.52" | 520 m || 
|-id=942 bgcolor=#E9E9E9
| 585942 ||  || — || April 15, 2012 || Haleakala || Pan-STARRS ||  || align=right | 2.1 km || 
|-id=943 bgcolor=#fefefe
| 585943 ||  || — || December 10, 2012 || Mount Lemmon || Mount Lemmon Survey ||  || align=right data-sort-value="0.56" | 560 m || 
|-id=944 bgcolor=#d6d6d6
| 585944 ||  || — || November 19, 2008 || Kitt Peak || Spacewatch ||  || align=right | 2.5 km || 
|-id=945 bgcolor=#E9E9E9
| 585945 ||  || — || November 9, 2018 || Mount Lemmon || Mount Lemmon Survey ||  || align=right | 1.8 km || 
|-id=946 bgcolor=#E9E9E9
| 585946 ||  || — || November 1, 2010 || Mount Lemmon || Mount Lemmon Survey ||  || align=right data-sort-value="0.92" | 920 m || 
|-id=947 bgcolor=#d6d6d6
| 585947 ||  || — || January 20, 2015 || Mount Lemmon || Mount Lemmon Survey ||  || align=right | 2.1 km || 
|-id=948 bgcolor=#d6d6d6
| 585948 ||  || — || October 27, 2008 || Kitt Peak || Spacewatch ||  || align=right | 1.8 km || 
|-id=949 bgcolor=#d6d6d6
| 585949 ||  || — || January 3, 2014 || Kitt Peak || Spacewatch ||  || align=right | 2.3 km || 
|-id=950 bgcolor=#d6d6d6
| 585950 ||  || — || March 18, 2010 || Mount Lemmon || Mount Lemmon Survey ||  || align=right | 1.7 km || 
|-id=951 bgcolor=#d6d6d6
| 585951 ||  || — || December 4, 2012 || Mount Lemmon || Mount Lemmon Survey ||  || align=right | 2.8 km || 
|-id=952 bgcolor=#fefefe
| 585952 ||  || — || September 10, 2015 || Haleakala || Pan-STARRS ||  || align=right data-sort-value="0.43" | 430 m || 
|-id=953 bgcolor=#d6d6d6
| 585953 ||  || — || October 15, 2012 || Haleakala || Pan-STARRS ||  || align=right | 2.0 km || 
|-id=954 bgcolor=#fefefe
| 585954 ||  || — || September 11, 2007 || Mount Lemmon || Mount Lemmon Survey ||  || align=right data-sort-value="0.50" | 500 m || 
|-id=955 bgcolor=#E9E9E9
| 585955 ||  || — || September 1, 2005 || Kitt Peak || Spacewatch ||  || align=right | 1.0 km || 
|-id=956 bgcolor=#d6d6d6
| 585956 ||  || — || October 21, 2012 || Haleakala || Pan-STARRS ||  || align=right | 2.0 km || 
|-id=957 bgcolor=#d6d6d6
| 585957 ||  || — || February 28, 2014 || Haleakala || Pan-STARRS ||  || align=right | 2.5 km || 
|-id=958 bgcolor=#E9E9E9
| 585958 ||  || — || April 15, 2021 || Mount Lemmon || Mount Lemmon Survey ||  || align=right data-sort-value="0.73" | 730 m || 
|-id=959 bgcolor=#d6d6d6
| 585959 ||  || — || May 14, 2005 || Kitt Peak || Spacewatch ||  || align=right | 3.0 km || 
|-id=960 bgcolor=#d6d6d6
| 585960 ||  || — || September 20, 2006 || Catalina || CSS ||  || align=right | 1.8 km || 
|-id=961 bgcolor=#E9E9E9
| 585961 ||  || — || January 16, 2015 || Haleakala || Pan-STARRS ||  || align=right | 2.0 km || 
|-id=962 bgcolor=#E9E9E9
| 585962 ||  || — || January 29, 2011 || Mount Lemmon || Mount Lemmon Survey ||  || align=right | 1.4 km || 
|-id=963 bgcolor=#d6d6d6
| 585963 ||  || — || January 6, 2000 || Kitt Peak || Spacewatch ||  || align=right | 2.9 km || 
|-id=964 bgcolor=#E9E9E9
| 585964 ||  || — || January 9, 2000 || Kitt Peak || Spacewatch ||  || align=right | 2.2 km || 
|-id=965 bgcolor=#C2FFFF
| 585965 ||  || — || January 12, 2000 || Kitt Peak || Spacewatch || L4 || align=right | 7.3 km || 
|-id=966 bgcolor=#E9E9E9
| 585966 ||  || — || January 5, 2000 || Kitt Peak || Spacewatch ||  || align=right | 1.6 km || 
|-id=967 bgcolor=#fefefe
| 585967 ||  || — || January 5, 2000 || Kitt Peak || Spacewatch ||  || align=right data-sort-value="0.61" | 610 m || 
|-id=968 bgcolor=#C2FFFF
| 585968 ||  || — || October 17, 2010 || Mount Lemmon || Mount Lemmon Survey || L4 || align=right | 8.0 km || 
|-id=969 bgcolor=#fefefe
| 585969 ||  || — || November 11, 2010 || Kitt Peak || Spacewatch ||  || align=right data-sort-value="0.67" | 670 m || 
|-id=970 bgcolor=#E9E9E9
| 585970 ||  || — || January 28, 2000 || Kitt Peak || Spacewatch ||  || align=right | 1.9 km || 
|-id=971 bgcolor=#E9E9E9
| 585971 ||  || — || March 11, 2005 || Mount Lemmon || Mount Lemmon Survey ||  || align=right | 1.7 km || 
|-id=972 bgcolor=#fefefe
| 585972 ||  || — || January 28, 2000 || Kitt Peak || Spacewatch ||  || align=right data-sort-value="0.70" | 700 m || 
|-id=973 bgcolor=#d6d6d6
| 585973 ||  || — || October 24, 2005 || Mauna Kea || Mauna Kea Obs. ||  || align=right | 3.1 km || 
|-id=974 bgcolor=#E9E9E9
| 585974 ||  || — || February 1, 2000 || Kitt Peak || Spacewatch ||  || align=right | 2.2 km || 
|-id=975 bgcolor=#d6d6d6
| 585975 ||  || — || February 6, 2000 || Kitt Peak || Spacewatch ||  || align=right | 2.6 km || 
|-id=976 bgcolor=#fefefe
| 585976 ||  || — || December 15, 2006 || Kitt Peak || Spacewatch ||  || align=right data-sort-value="0.77" | 770 m || 
|-id=977 bgcolor=#fefefe
| 585977 ||  || — || February 4, 2000 || Kitt Peak || Spacewatch ||  || align=right data-sort-value="0.52" | 520 m || 
|-id=978 bgcolor=#d6d6d6
| 585978 ||  || — || February 27, 2000 || Kitt Peak || Spacewatch ||  || align=right | 2.9 km || 
|-id=979 bgcolor=#E9E9E9
| 585979 ||  || — || February 26, 2014 || Haleakala || Pan-STARRS ||  || align=right | 2.2 km || 
|-id=980 bgcolor=#fefefe
| 585980 ||  || — || March 3, 2000 || Socorro || LINEAR ||  || align=right data-sort-value="0.91" | 910 m || 
|-id=981 bgcolor=#d6d6d6
| 585981 ||  || — || March 3, 2000 || Kitt Peak || Spacewatch ||  || align=right | 2.0 km || 
|-id=982 bgcolor=#d6d6d6
| 585982 ||  || — || November 14, 2002 || Kitt Peak || Spacewatch ||  || align=right | 2.3 km || 
|-id=983 bgcolor=#E9E9E9
| 585983 ||  || — || November 30, 2003 || Kitt Peak || Spacewatch ||  || align=right | 1.9 km || 
|-id=984 bgcolor=#d6d6d6
| 585984 ||  || — || March 29, 2000 || Kitt Peak || Spacewatch ||  || align=right | 2.4 km || 
|-id=985 bgcolor=#fefefe
| 585985 ||  || — || February 10, 2011 || Mount Lemmon || Mount Lemmon Survey ||  || align=right data-sort-value="0.54" | 540 m || 
|-id=986 bgcolor=#d6d6d6
| 585986 ||  || — || January 31, 2009 || Kitt Peak || Spacewatch ||  || align=right | 1.9 km || 
|-id=987 bgcolor=#C2FFFF
| 585987 ||  || — || April 4, 2000 || Apache Point || SDSS Collaboration || L4 || align=right | 8.0 km || 
|-id=988 bgcolor=#fefefe
| 585988 ||  || — || April 24, 2000 || Kitt Peak || Spacewatch ||  || align=right data-sort-value="0.51" | 510 m || 
|-id=989 bgcolor=#fefefe
| 585989 ||  || — || April 26, 2000 || Kitt Peak || Spacewatch ||  || align=right data-sort-value="0.72" | 720 m || 
|-id=990 bgcolor=#fefefe
| 585990 ||  || — || July 4, 2000 || Kitt Peak || Spacewatch ||  || align=right data-sort-value="0.61" | 610 m || 
|-id=991 bgcolor=#d6d6d6
| 585991 ||  || — || July 29, 2000 || Cerro Tololo || M. W. Buie, S. D. Kern ||  || align=right | 1.8 km || 
|-id=992 bgcolor=#fefefe
| 585992 ||  || — || November 25, 2011 || Haleakala || Pan-STARRS ||  || align=right data-sort-value="0.49" | 490 m || 
|-id=993 bgcolor=#E9E9E9
| 585993 ||  || — || October 5, 2013 || Mount Lemmon || Mount Lemmon Survey ||  || align=right data-sort-value="0.92" | 920 m || 
|-id=994 bgcolor=#fefefe
| 585994 ||  || — || August 26, 2000 || Cerro Tololo || R. Millis, L. H. Wasserman ||  || align=right data-sort-value="0.76" | 760 m || 
|-id=995 bgcolor=#d6d6d6
| 585995 ||  || — || August 31, 2000 || Kitt Peak || Spacewatch ||  || align=right | 2.6 km || 
|-id=996 bgcolor=#fefefe
| 585996 ||  || — || September 3, 2000 || Kitt Peak || Spacewatch ||  || align=right data-sort-value="0.71" | 710 m || 
|-id=997 bgcolor=#E9E9E9
| 585997 ||  || — || August 20, 2000 || Anderson Mesa || LONEOS ||  || align=right | 1.0 km || 
|-id=998 bgcolor=#d6d6d6
| 585998 ||  || — || January 11, 2008 || Kitt Peak || Spacewatch ||  || align=right | 2.6 km || 
|-id=999 bgcolor=#fefefe
| 585999 ||  || — || August 10, 2007 || Kitt Peak || Spacewatch ||  || align=right data-sort-value="0.62" | 620 m || 
|-id=000 bgcolor=#E9E9E9
| 586000 ||  || — || March 10, 2007 || Mount Lemmon || Mount Lemmon Survey ||  || align=right | 1.5 km || 
|}

References

External links 
 Discovery Circumstances: Numbered Minor Planets (585001)–(590000) (IAU Minor Planet Center)

0585